= Collett & Sons =

Heavy Lift and Oversize transport company in UK

Collett & Sons (Collett Transport) is a Limited company specialising in heavy transport, heavy lift, marine and transport consulting services.

== History ==
Established in Halifax in 1928 by Richard Collett, the company began as a dairy farming business. When taking his own milk to the dairy by horse and cart, other local farmers asked Richard to take theirs too, which was the beginning of R. Collett Transport.

In 1933 the Milk Marketing Board (MMB) was established to market milk. This resulted in the Board paying for the collection of milk from farms, and on the back of this Richard purchased his first commercial vehicle. The end of the Second World War in 1945 released ex-army vehicles, chiefly Bedfords and Thorneycrofts to the commercial market, expanding the Collett fleet and the milk collection business.

With the introduction of tankers in 1970, the need for milk churns declined and the Collett fleet of vehicles reduced from 14 to five. The milk haulage side of the business was abandoned in 1974 giving way to the formation of R. Collett & Sons Transport (Ltd). With Richard (2) now at the helm, his five sons joined the business to fill various roles, and the focus of the company was shifted from general to heavy haulage and abnormal loads.

Collett features a fleet of 68 tractor units and various trailer combinations with a total carrying capacity of 11,537 Tonnes. The company features 40th in the ICT Transport 50, a ranking of the world's largest specialised transport companies. Collett & Sons Ltd become the first company in the UK to welcome a Scheuerle BladeLifter trailer, specifically for transporting wind turbine blades.

== Depots ==
Having operated from sites in Keighley and Bradford, Collett moved premises to Halifax in 1996, this has since been the company's head office.

- 2008 the company purchased a second depot in Goole to accommodate European business growth.
- 2014 Collett open their third depot, a portside 2 acre site at the Port of Grangemouth for import/export, project cargo & breakbulk services.
- 2016 Collett joins the Route To Space Alliance, as the English representative, forming a collaboration of hauliers across Europe providing transport services.
- 2017 Collett launch their Ireland subsidiary, enabling the delivery of wind farm projects (Tullahennel & Meenwaun)
- 2020 Collett expands with new 76,000sq ft Bradford warehouse.

== Equipment ==
=== Girder Bridge ===
In 2014 Collett purchased Europe's largest capacity girder bridge. Manufactured by Scheuerle and TII Group, the 550 Tonne capacity girder bridge is designed specifically for the transportation of power transformers.

=== Crane Vehicle Fleet ===
BS7121 Part 4 compliant front and rear mounted cranes with lifting capacities ranging from 9 Tonne/Meter to 205 Tonne/Metre. The 205 Tonne capacity is provided by a 8x4 Mercedes 4155 tractor unit complete with an Effer 2055 crane vehicle with 6 boom extensions providing a maximum reach and lift capacity of 30,000 kg at 4.51m and 8,550 kg at 15.25m.

=== SPMTs (Self Propelled Modular Transporters) ===
Platform vehicles with hydrostatic driven axles and programmable steering options for multiple steering geometry patterns.

=== Escort Vehicles ===
Code of Practice pilot cars for abnormal load escorting.

=== Jacking & Skidding ===
Holmatro multi-functional synchronous hydraulic heavy lift system, monitoring the position of loads between the four jacks to within a 1mm tolerance, for raising and sliding components up to 500 Tonnes.

Hydraulic Modular trailers

Hydraulic modular trailers HMT is a specialised oversize non-powered transport trailer which has multiple axle line to support heavy loads. Collett has a fleet of HMTs from known brands like Goldhofer and Scheuerle.

Ballast Tractors.

Ballast Tractor are specialized heavy duty road tractors to tow hydraulic modular trailers. These tractors feature a ballast box instead to fifth wheel and tow couplings for drawbar configuration. Collett has MAN ballast tractor to couple with HMTs to move super heavy loads like vessels and transformers

== Notable projects ==
- Burbo Bank Offshore Wind Farm
- 3D Swept Path Analysis
- City & Guilds Abnormal Load Escort Driver Training
- Thrust 2 & Thrust SSC
- Littlebrook Power Station
- Kype Muir Wind Farm
- Cameo role in Sky One's COBRA drama series
- July–August 2020 Four pressure vessels from Elsmrere Port to Colshill

== See also ==
- ALE
- Sarens
- Mammoet
- Pickfords
- Omega Morgan
- Lampson International
- Faymonville Group
