= Heavy lift =

Activity of moving overweight and oversize cargo

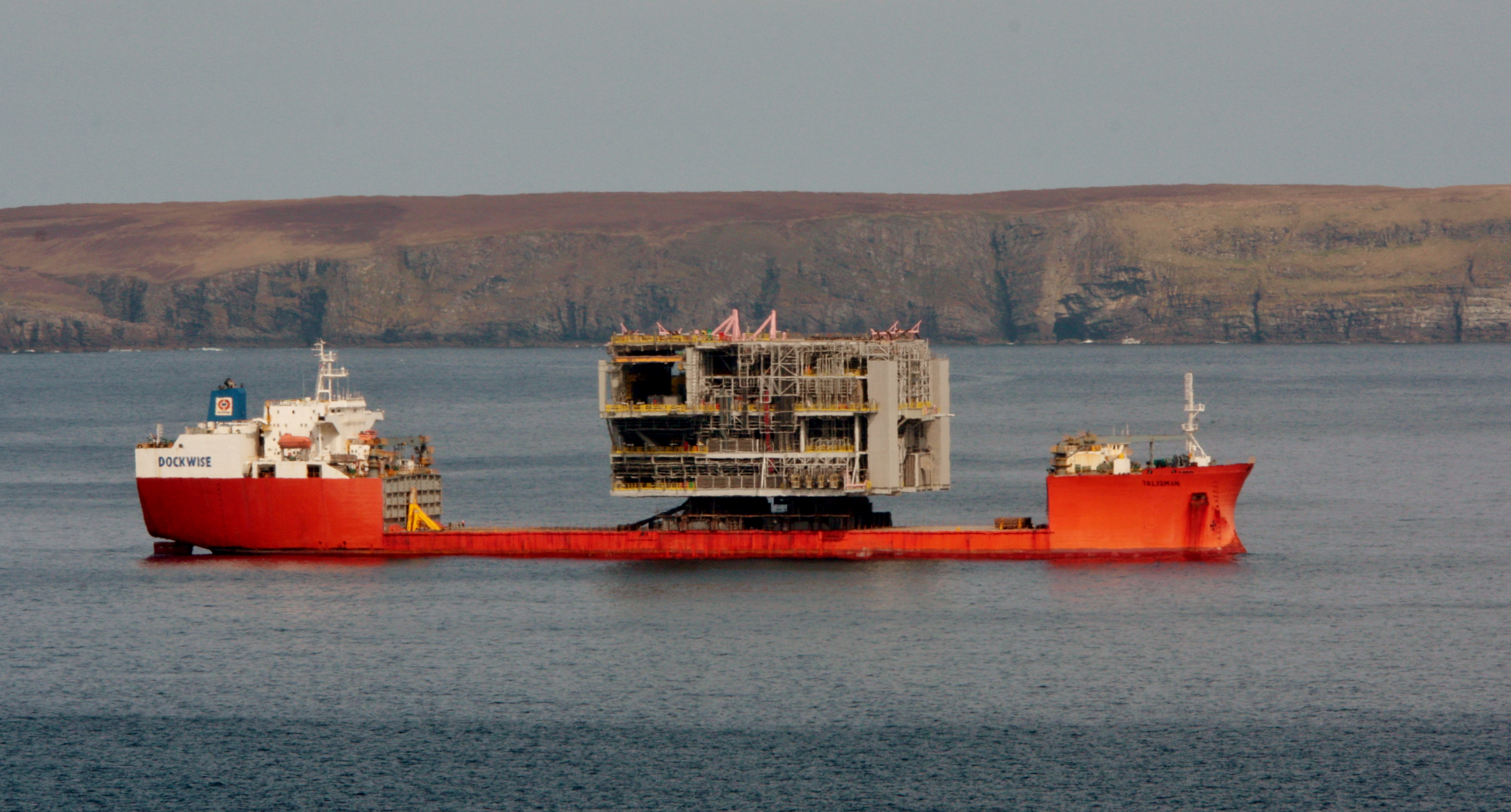
Heavy lift ship transporting oil platform in Shetland

In transportation, heavy lift refers to the handling and installation of heavy items which are indivisible, and of weights generally accepted to be over 100 tons and of widths/heights of more than 100 meters. These oversized items are transported from one place to another (sometimes across country borders), then lifted or installed into place. Characteristic of heavy-lift goods is the absence of standardization, which requires individual transport planning.

== Uses ==
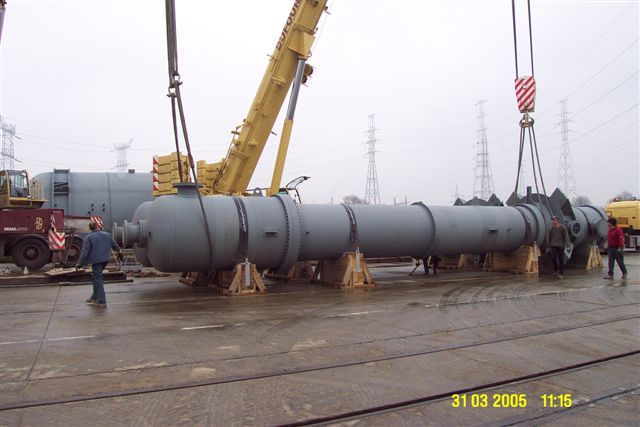
Heat exchanger being handled by mobile cranes for project cargo transportation

Heavy-lift cargo includes generators, turbines, reactors, boilers, towers, casting, heaters, presses, locomotives, boats, satellites, military personnel and equipment. In the offshore industry, parts of oil rigs and production platforms are also lifted.

== Mode of transport ==
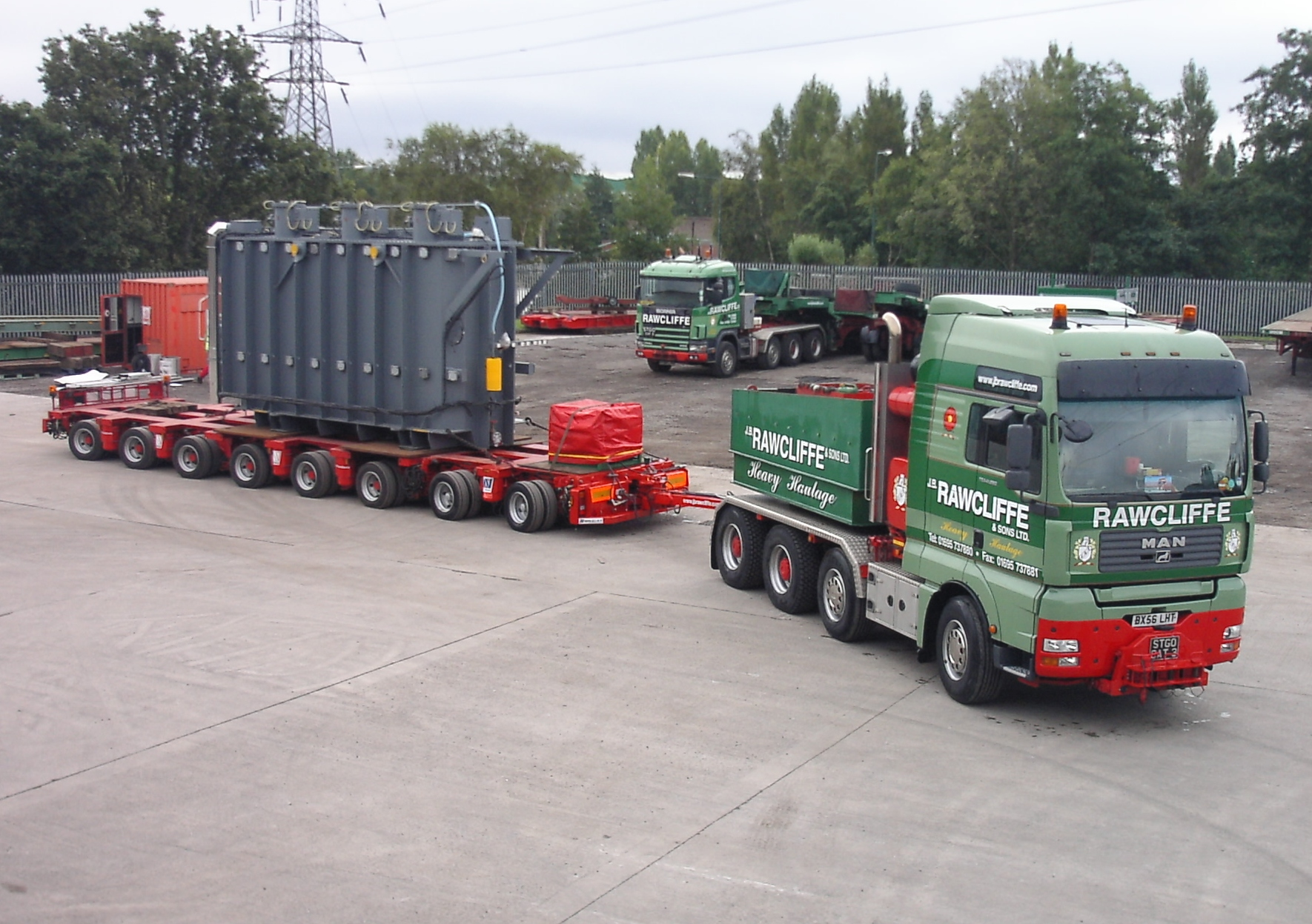
Transformer being transported on Nicolas 8 line hydraulic modular trailer coupled with a MAN 8x6 ballast tractor.

=== Road transport ===
Road transport of heavy and oversized load is called heavy haulage specialized equipment is used to haul these load, which are only employed for heavy-duty work. This type of transport requires route planning and escort vehicles. Road transport is carried out from or to manufacturing plants or factories.

Heavy lift road equipment:

- Lowboy trailers
- Hydraulic modular trailers
- Tractor unit
- Ballast tractor
- self-propelled modular trailer
- Mobile cranes

=== Air transport ===
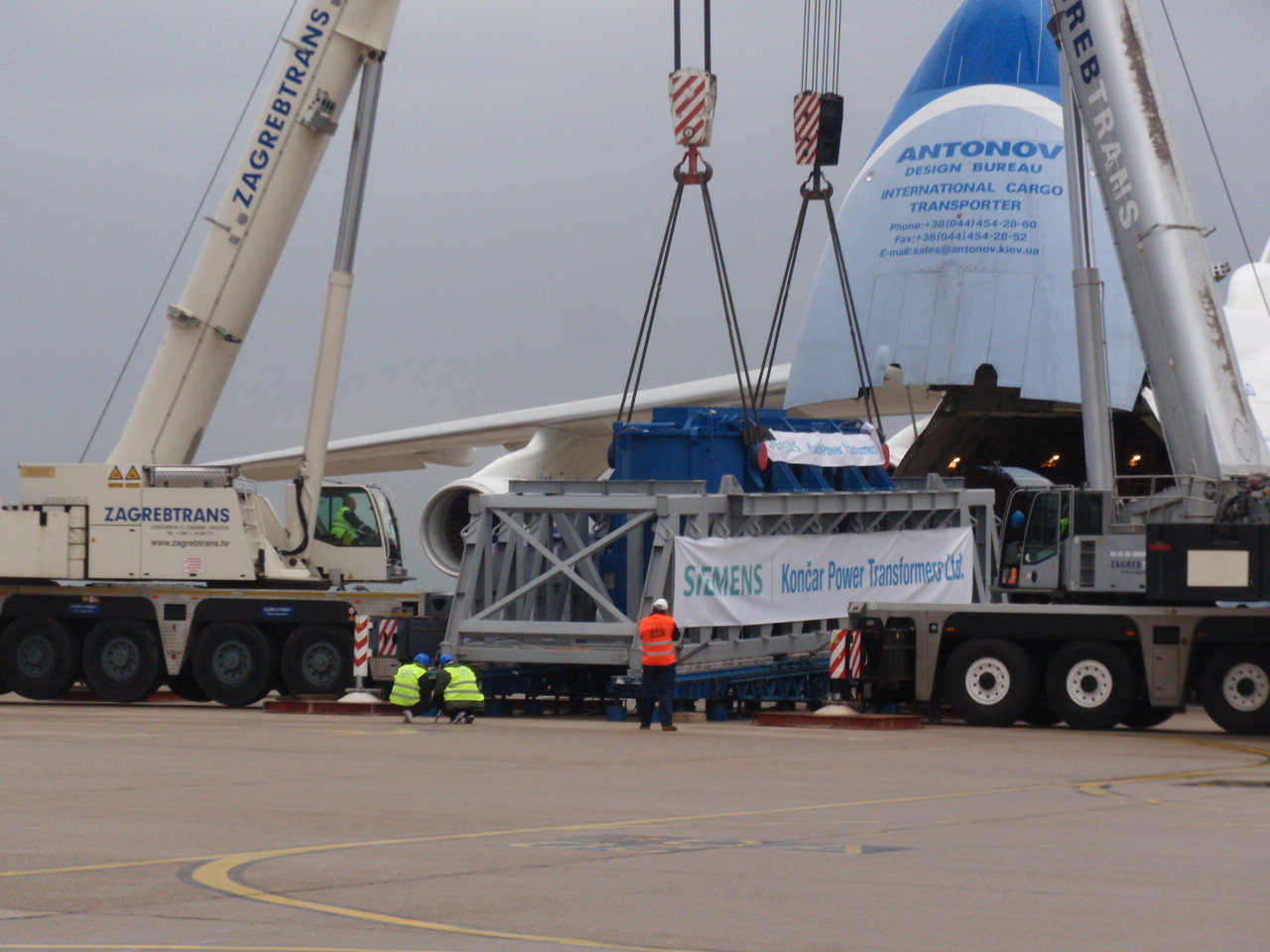
Siemens Transformer being loaded onto an Antonov AN-225 cargo plane at Zagreb airport.

Heavy lift transport of project cargo is done using cargo planes, which are one of the largest aircraft due to the size of the load these loads are carried to or from airports via road transport. In 2021 Gebrüder Weiss a logistics company chartered an Antonov An-225 Mriya world's largest cargo plane to transport project cargo from China to Poland for a Polish factory. This was done due to scarcity of time in the COVID-19 pandemic.

Largest cargo planes:

- Antonov An-225 Mriya
- Antonov An-124 Condor
- Boeing 747-8 Freighter
- Lockheed C-5 Galaxy
- Airbus Beluga XL

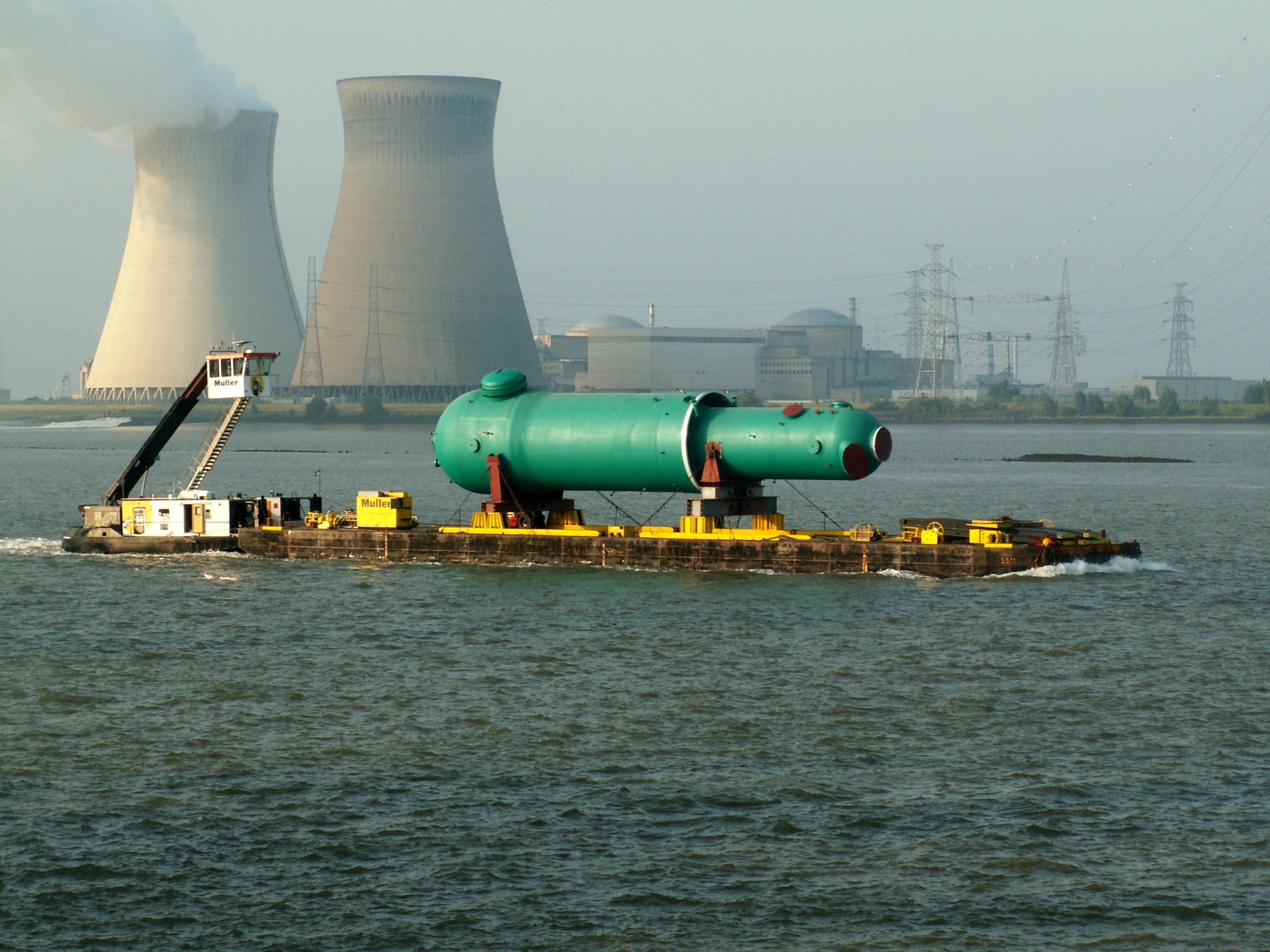
Oversize cargo being transported on a deck barge in Antwerp

=== Sea transport ===
Sea transport is the preferred mode of transport for long distance due to large space and low cost when compared to air transport, but this mode of transport requires more planning and the transport itself takes long time. Loads are carried to the port via road transport, later cranes and gantry are used to place loads onto or into the vessels.

Heavy lift sea equipment:

- Heavy lift ship
- Deck barge
- Roro ship
- Lolo ship
- Crane vessel
- Tugboat

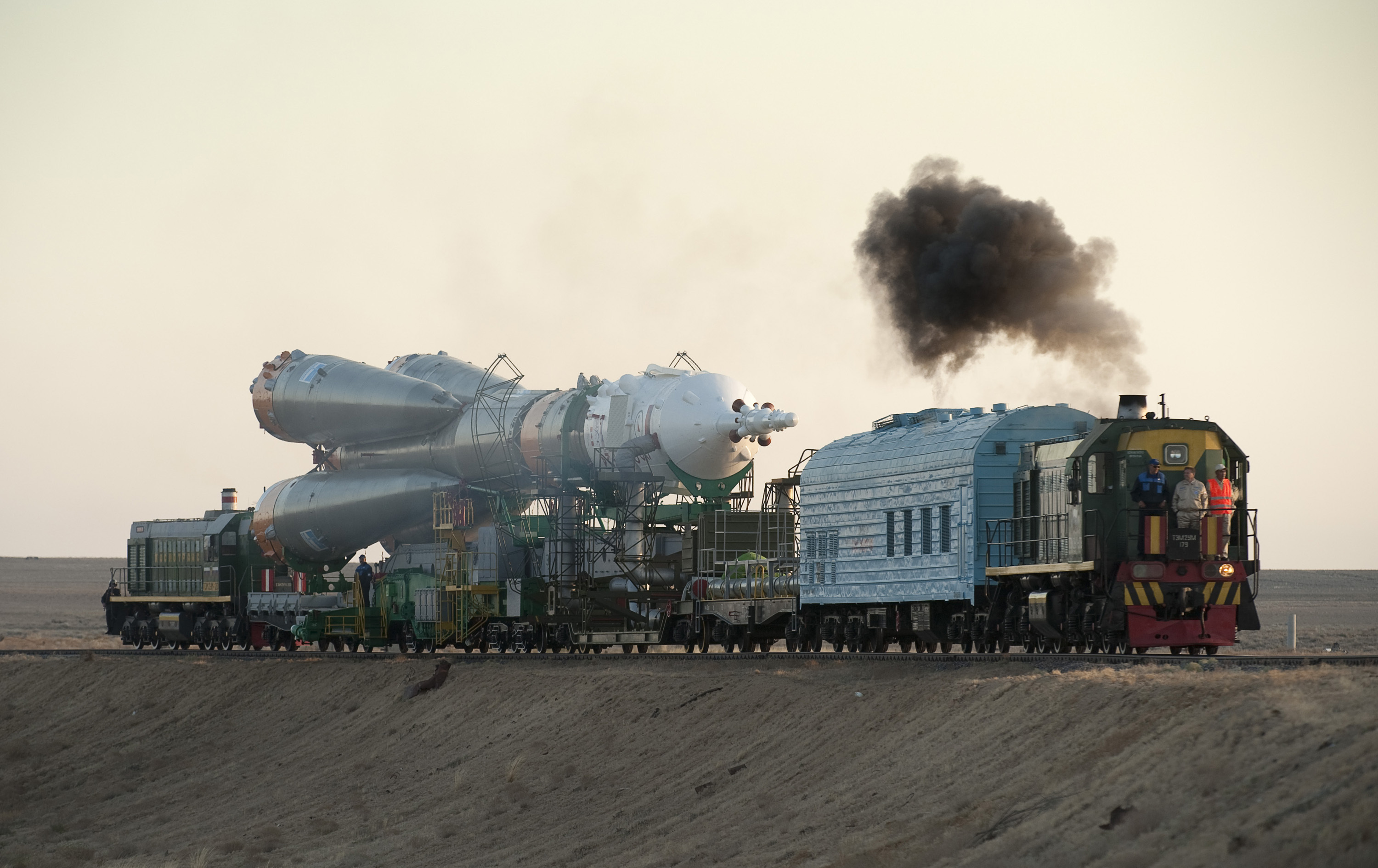
Soyuz TMA-16 space rocket, being transported on a specialized railcar to Baikonur Cosmodrome spaceport in Kazakhstan.

=== Rail transport ===
For land transport, rail transport is also considered as an option for hauling heavy lift cargo over road transport due to advantages of higher speeds, bulk transportation and lower cost compared to road transport. Companies have managed to haul cargos over 250 tons and 30 meters long, and some have also started moves longer cargos like windmill blades. Disadvantage to the rail transport is the access ability and size restrictions. Railroads are not connected to airports and ports directly, ultimately the cargo has to be transmitted to road transport to reach the final destination.

Heavy lift rail equipment:

- Flatcar
- Crane car
- Lowmac car
- Schnabel car
- Push-pull trains

== See also ==
- Oversize load
- SPMT
- Cargo aircraft
- Cargo ship
- Crane
- Heavy hauler
- Jack
- Gantry
- Rigging

== Literature ==
- Pieper, Marcus: Durchführung eines Schwergut-Transportes mit Binnenschiff und Straßenfahrzeug aus technischer und organisatorischer Sicht. Bremen 1997.
- Internationale Transport-Zeitschrift; 2008, 13/14. Spezial: Break Bulk, Schwergut-Special
