= Powerpack (drivetrain) =

Part of a modular powertrain containing the engine

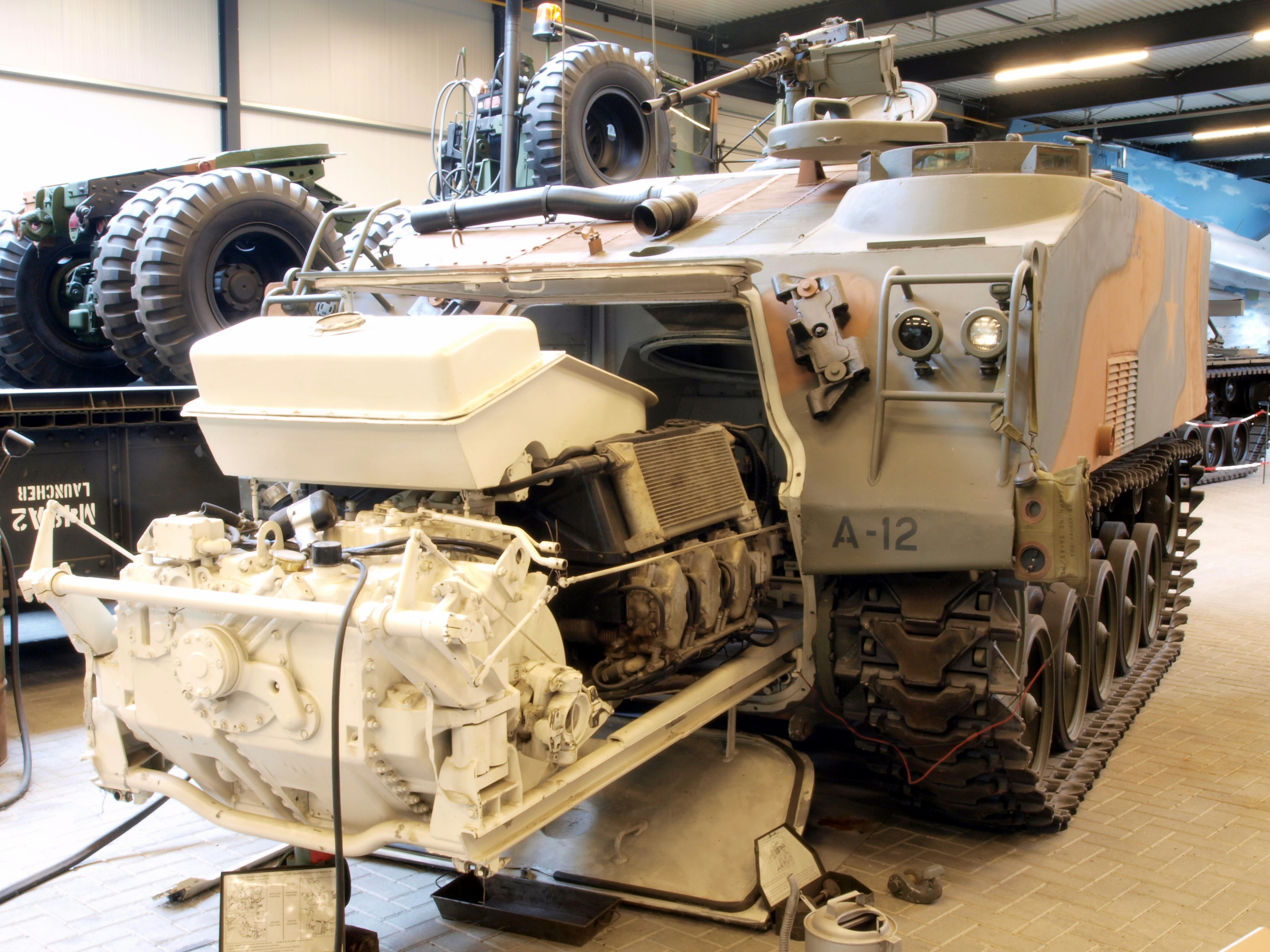
Powerpack removal of an M75 APC

A powerpack or power pack is a part of a modular powertrain that contains some type of engine (most frequently an internal combustion engine, ⁣⁣ but other types, including electric motors, are possible) and may also contain a transmission and various supporting components.

== Applications ==
Power packs are used with certain types of industrial equipment designs, including vehicle designs such as self-propelled modular transporter, hydraulic modular trailer, forklifts and cherry picker lifts, but also stationary equipment such as paint sprayers. Virtually all modern military tanks use them, an early example being the M26 Pershing and Chieftain, and many other military vehicles as well.

== Advantages ==
The modularity is what makes a powerpack powertrain different from other types; using the term powerpack implies that the whole unit can be easily removed or separated from the rest of the machine, allowing it to be rapidly replaced by another powerpack while the original is repaired or disposed of, and minimizing the amount of time that the entire machine is out of use. Even in cases where the powerpack is not being replaced, being able to remove it can make repairs easier and faster.

== Innovations ==
=== Trailer Power Assist ===
Scheuerle a subsidiary of the Transporter Industry International (TII Group) a Heilbronn based heavy-duty transport vehicles manufacturer managed to build a powerpack using their K25 modular platform the powerpack avoids the need of extra ballast tractors while towing a hydraulic modular trailer combinations. Called as Trailer Power Assist (TPA) the powerpack is power by a 1000hp diesel engine with traction force of 400 kilonewtons use of the specialized powerpack make maneuverability, braking and steering more synchronized due to less number of tractor employed which also reduces overall gross combination weight and fuel consumption massively.

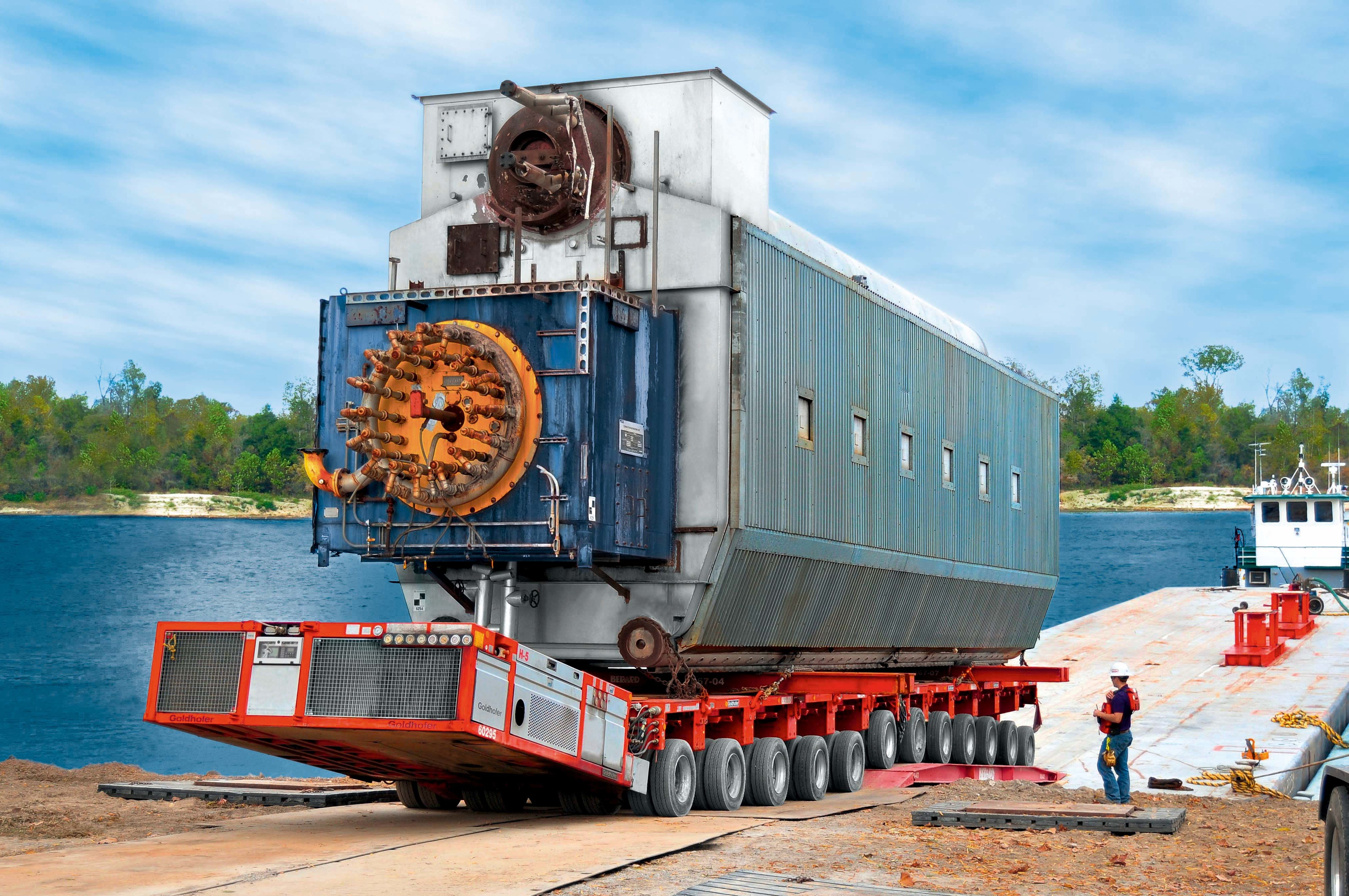
A powerpack at the frontend of Goldhofer SPMT hauling oversize load.

=== Hybrid Powered ===
Cometto an Italy based transport engineering company and subsidiary of Faymonville Group developed their first hybrid powered powerpack in the end of 2024 for their ModulMAX SP-E SPMT looking at eco-friendly manufacturing unit laws in Denmark which requires all the workers to leave the unit while the diesel powered vehicles are operating inside. They believe that other countries will soon follow the same laws and demand for such solutions would peak in near future. The powerpack has a 250hp diesel engine and 135hp electric motor which reduces the noise levels so that employees can work in proximity of the transporter. Operators can switch diesel to hybrid and vice versa with a click of a button which make open air operation easy.

=== Electric Powered ===
In the beginning of 2025 Goldhofer a Memmingen based German transport solution manufacturer developed their fully electric powerpack for their PST/SL-E Split SPMT which is capable of lifting 45 tons per axle row with high lifting capacity the SPMT also features widening option to choose width of the platform from 9.8ft to 16.7ft which is helpful in securing the load and also reduces the requirement of side by side combination. Goldhofer E-Powerpack is based on their Airport Technology division which already manufactured fully electric aircraft tractors with capacity to pushback above 300 tons.

== See also ==
- Prime mover
- Power-egg
- Power module
- Hydraulic modular trailer
- Self-propelled modular transporter
