= Lampson International =

American crane manufacturer

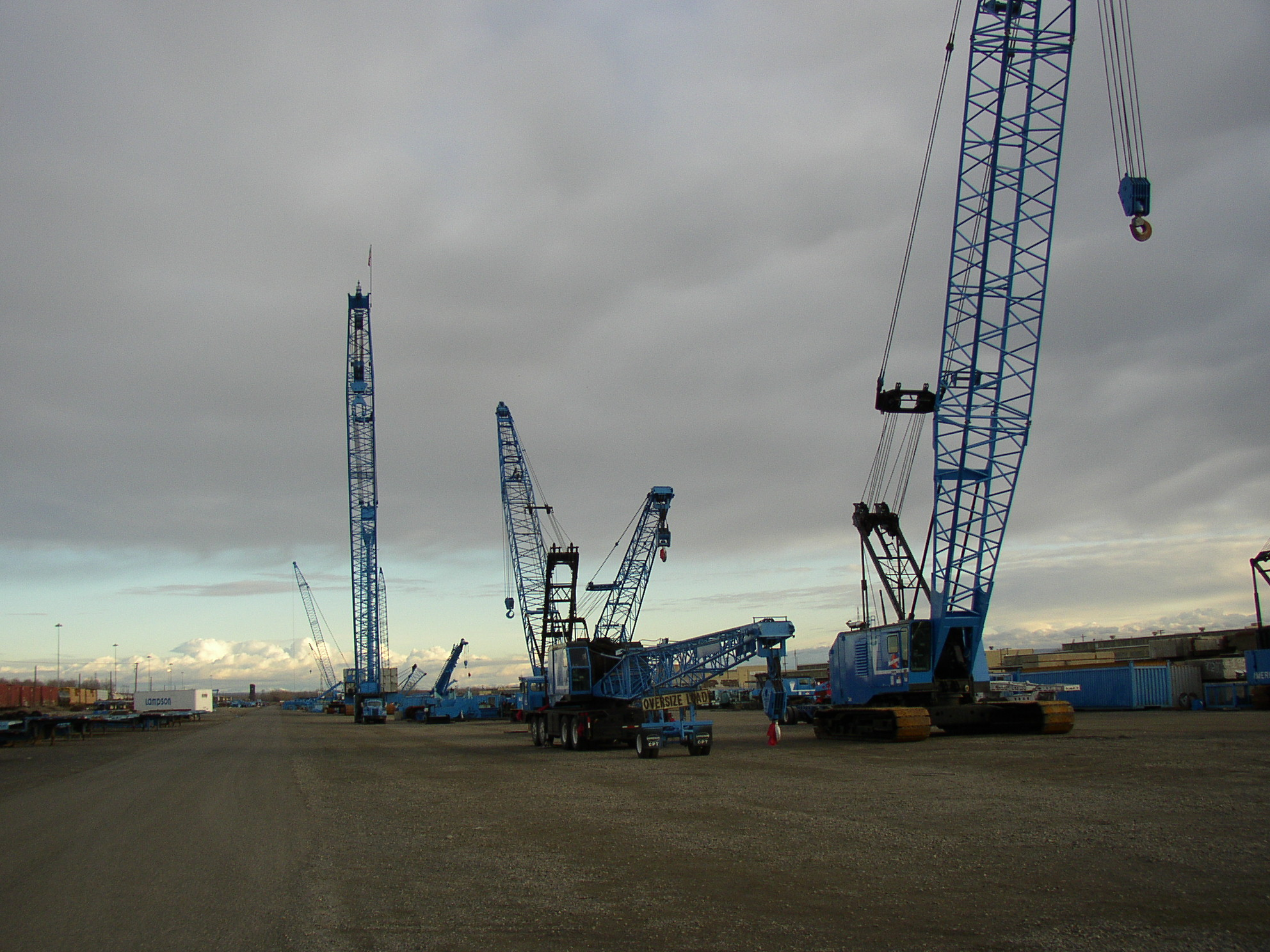
Lampson International crane in Pasco, Washington

Lampson International is a crane manufacturer located in Kennewick, Washington established in 1946 by Neil F. Lampson. (Lampson Stadium in Kennewick is named after this same man.) Lampson operates one of the largest crane fleets in the United States with a fleet including heavy lift cranes with capacities from 100 tons to 750 tons and heavy lift transi-lift cranes with capacities from 500 tons to 3,000 tons.

== Equipment ==
- Ring Cranes
- Crawler Cranes
- Mobile Cranes
- Rough Terrain Cranes
- All Terrain Cranes
- Tractor-Trailers
- Ballast Tractors
- Hydraulic Modular Trailer
- Self-propelled Modular Trailer
- Crawler Transporter

== Lampson Trans-Lift ==
Trans-Lift is Lampsons in-house lifting system developed for super heavy loads and modular platform to suit client needs. Started back in 1978 by Neil F Lampson with in house engineering, manufacturing, assembling and testing.

| Name | Type | Capacity (t) | Main Boom (m) |
|---|---|---|---|
| LTL-350/500 | Crawler | 390 | |
| LTL-1000/1100 | Crawler | 1,100 | 200 |
| LTL-1200 | Crawler | 1,200 | 200 |
| LTL-1500 | Crawler | 1,500 | 200 |
| LTL-2600 | Crawler | 2,600 | 240 |
| LTL-3000 | Crawler | 3,000 | 260 |

== LTL-2600 ==
The Lampson LTL-2600 or Transilift 2600 is a super-heavy mobile crane. With an ultimate load capability of over 2,600 short tons-force (2,400,000 kg_{f}), it is among the largest land-based mobile crawler cranes in existence in terms of capacity. It has a maximum boom length of 460 feet (140 m) and maximum jib length of 240 feet (73 m).

Design of the crane began in 1994, making it relatively old. Four examples of the crane are in existence: two built in 1995 that operate in Australia, one built in 2003 that operates in the United States, and one built in 2008 that operates in China. The older three cranes are operated by Lampson International, with the Chinese example the only one to be sold to and operated by an outside company.

As a crawler crane, the entire machine can carry a load short distances at a job site, increasing its flexibility. The crane consists of two crawler modules, a boom/jig assembly, and a large counterweight composed of containers of local materials (typically earth or gravel). The crane assembly is designed to be mobile, with pinned rather than welded modular construction, so it can be broken down and transported by a fleet of trucks. Each unit costs approximately $28 million.

== See also ==
- Big Blue Crane collapse
