= Faymonville Group =

Heavy equipment business group

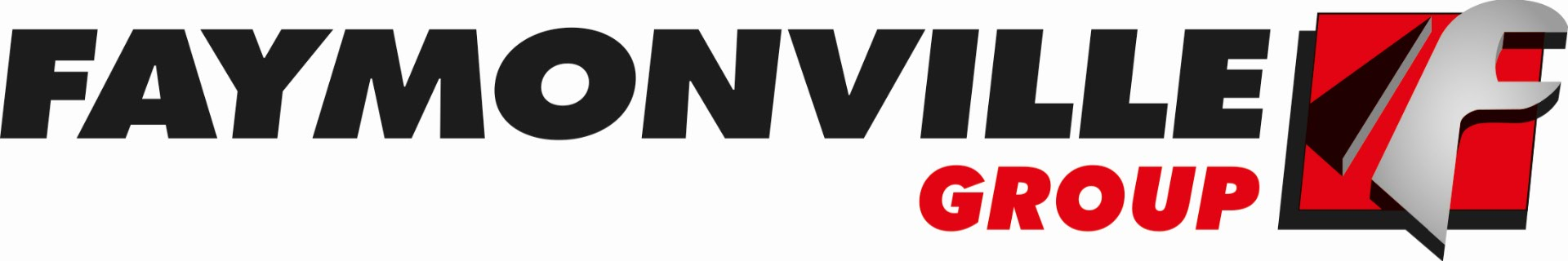
- Industry: Logistics
- Founded: 1960 Rocherath, Belgium.
- Headquarters: Luxembourg
- Area served: Worldwide
- Key people: Alexander Fickers (CEO)
- Products: Trailer; Hydraulic modular trailer SPMT
- Brands: MAX Trailer; Faymonville; Cometto
- Number of employees: 1000+
- Website: https://www.faymonville.com/company/

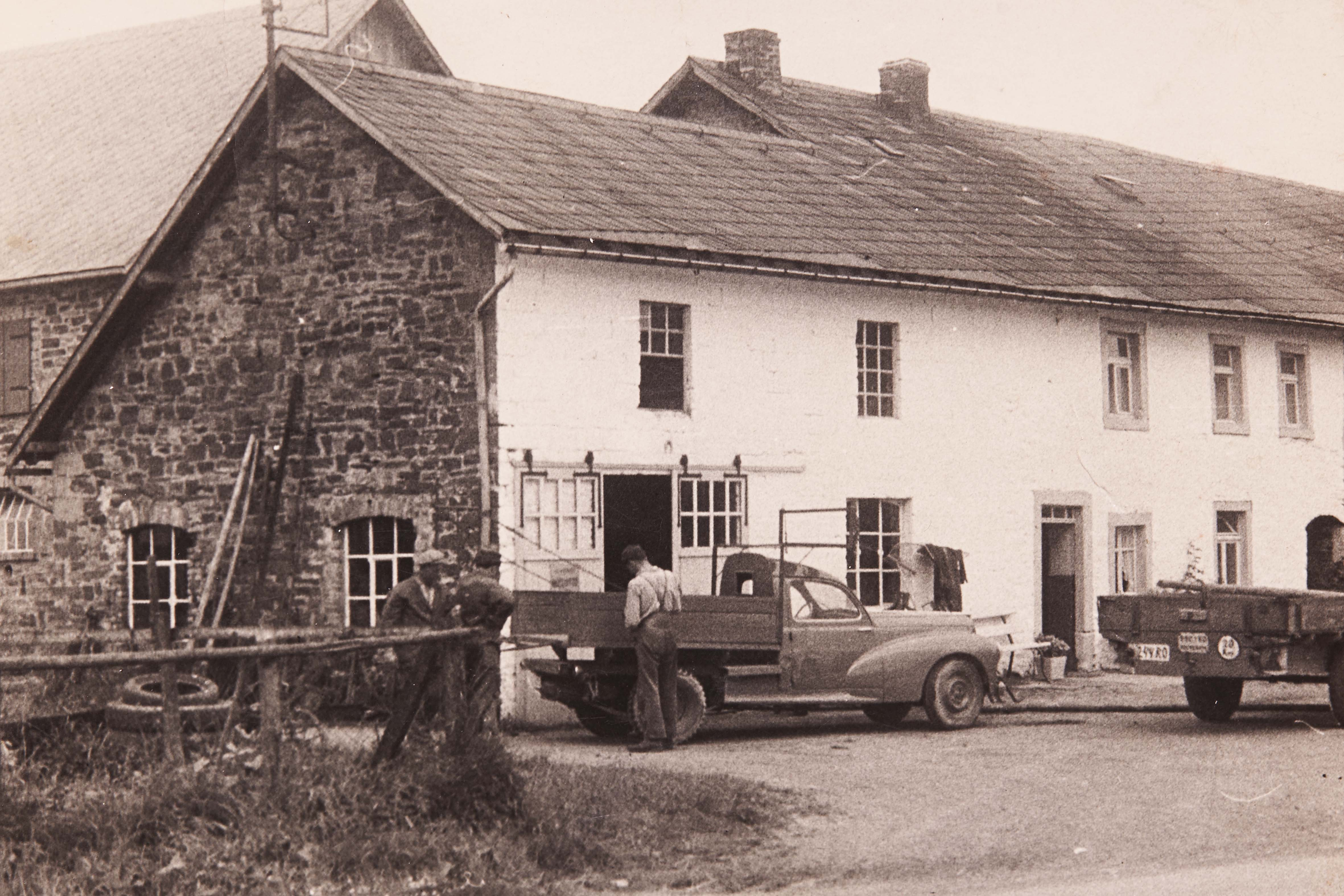
Faymonville manufacturing unit in Rocherath, Belgium. In the 1960s

Faymonville Group is a trailer and heavy transport equipment manufacturer operating worldwide. Started back in the 1960s in Rocherath, Belgium as a blacksmith shop, Faymonville Group later started to manufacture and sell agriculture machines and tractor cabins. In 1962, they opened a new production unit to fulfill the demand of forestry vehicles. In the late 1960s, the company manufactured its first semi-trailer. Today, it manufactures every type of trailer for different transportation needs, ranging from flatbeds to SPMTs. It has four production facilities spread around Europe: Luxembourg, Belgium, Poland and Italy, while having its headquarters in Luxembourg.

The group has acquired and created brands to cater different transport requirements. Faymonville group developed Max trailer brand in 2012 to cater to basic transportation needs. In 2017, Faymonville group acquired Cometto, which is a leading player in SPMT and industry transporter manufacturing, with Faymonville as the primary brand.

== History ==
The brand started as a blacksmith shop in the village, Rocherath, Belgium. Later, they developed a manufacturing unit for sale and production of agriculture equipments and tractor cabins. In late 1960 the company manufactured its first semi-trailer, the large number of glass manufacturers being a motivator for the growth of the brand. Their first low bed trailer was manufactured in 1973 for transporting glass. Looking for a solution to transport glass panes vertically, they developed a special inloader trailer in 1977. In 1980, the first extendable trailer with hydraulic steering was manufactured by the company.

With ever so growing demand, the old manufacturing unit could not compensate. Therefore, in 1988 a new unit was built in Büllingen, Belgium which could handle higher demand and production. Since then, the product line was expanded to meet new needs of customers. New production units were added in 2003 in Luxembourg, 2006 in Poland and a CKD assembly unit in Moscow.

In 2014 Faymonville developed a facility in Noginsk, Russia to cater the needs of the Russian customers mainly due to harsh weather conditions trailers needed regular repairs and maintenance. At the facility, the company offers assembly of the trailers and also training for the drivers to operate the trailers properly.

In 2015 Faymonville got patent rights for dual lane multi-axle transport vehicles, called the “897 patent.” trailers to develop a HMT for American market which fit under the regulations of the local authorities. In the result of obtaining the patent, Faymonville launched its DualMAX dual lane HMT modules in American and Canadian markets which had special widening characteristic to change the width of the trailer from 14 ft (4.27 m) to 21 ft (6.4 m) this feature makes the transportation of the empty module easy and also complies with the regulations. The company claimed that single axle line has a payload capacity of close to 24 tons.

In 2019 Faymonville acquired Stürzer Heavy Trucks, a sale and service dealer based in Landsberg am Lech, Germany. As a result of the new acquisition a new company was formed Faymonville Trade & Services to provide sale and service of special equipment from their Faymonville, Max Trailer, and Cometto brand but also sales and service for heavy-duty tractors from other manufacturers will be made available at the same facility.

Faymonville group also has an online trailer sales platform which trades in trailers from their brands like MAX Trailer, Faymonville and Cometto. Through which it provides trailers to customers worldwide.

In 2024 Faymonville Group started building their fifth production facility and first one in US. Company chose Little Rock, Arkansas for its connectivity for rail, road, and water network. This facility will be built in two phases phase one covering 409000 sq ft and phase two 624000 sq ft which is said to be completed in 2026. The facility will offer trailer production for North American specialized products like the Dual Max, Highway, Tele and many more.

Location	Use	Area	Brand
Poland	Trailer production	50,000 m^{2}	MAX Trailer
Luxembourg	Research & Development	36,250 m^{2}	Multiple
Belgium	automation, robotics and mechanical processing	30,000 m^{2}	Multiple
Italy	SPMT production	N/A	Cometto
Russia	Knock-down kit	N/A	Multiple
America	Trailer production	9,988 m^{2}	Multiple

== Brands ==
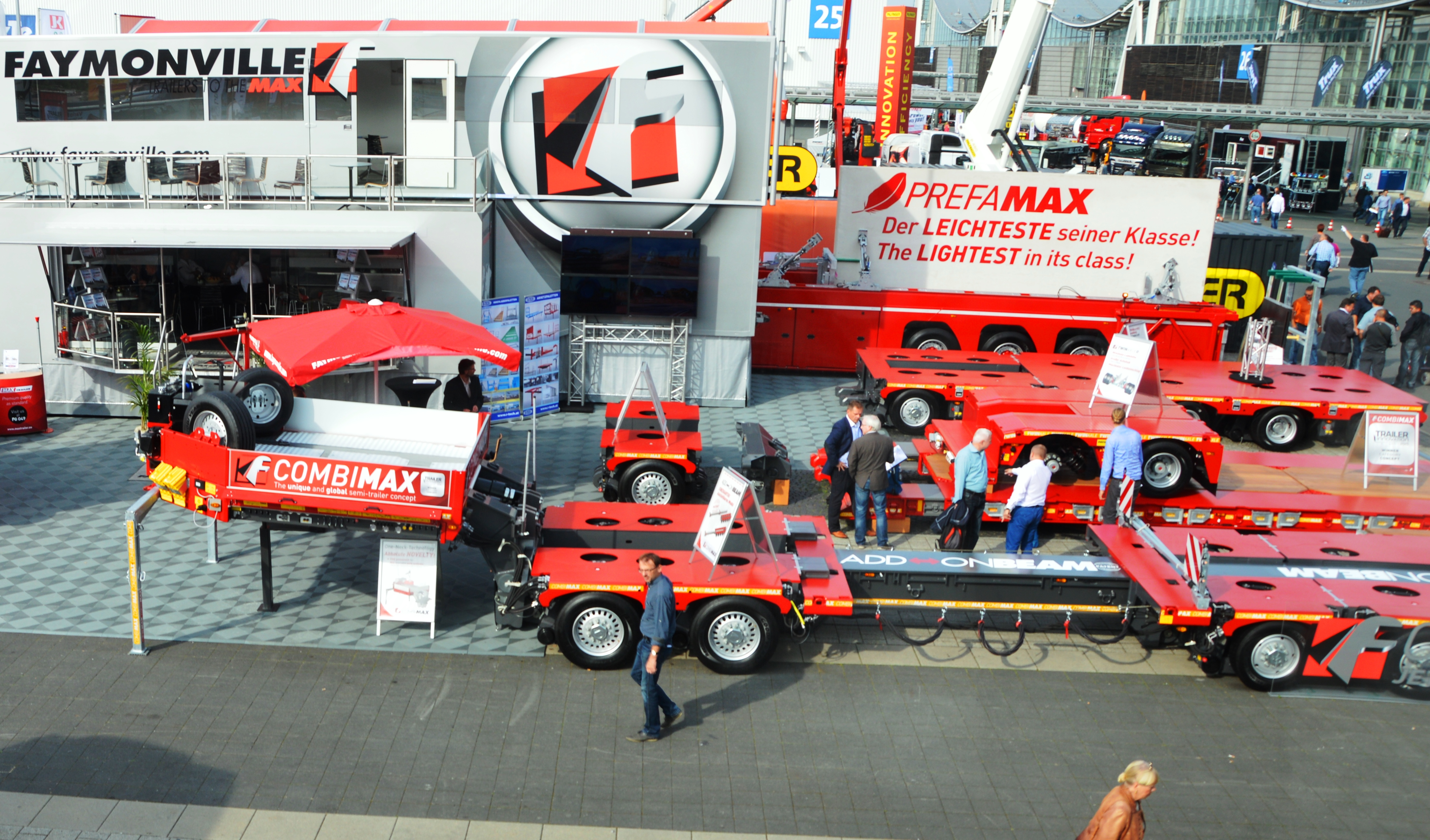
Faymonville trailers at IAA Commercial Vehicles show 2014 in Hannover, Germany.

- MAX trailer
- Faymonville
- Cometto

== MAX trailers ==
MAX Trailer brand is developed by the Faymonville Group in 2012 for basic transport need and transporting payload of 15 to 60 tons, having 2 to 6 axles. The range includes normal trailers, semi-trailer, lowbed trailers and flatbed trailers. Faymonville open their first facility in Goleniow solely for assembly of their MAX trailer lineup in 2013.

In 2024, Faymonville announced the launch of their wind tower adapter, with free rotation device, to fill the last gap in their range.

=== Products ===
- MAX100
- MAX200
- MAX300
- MAX410
- MAX510
- MAX600

== Faymonville ==
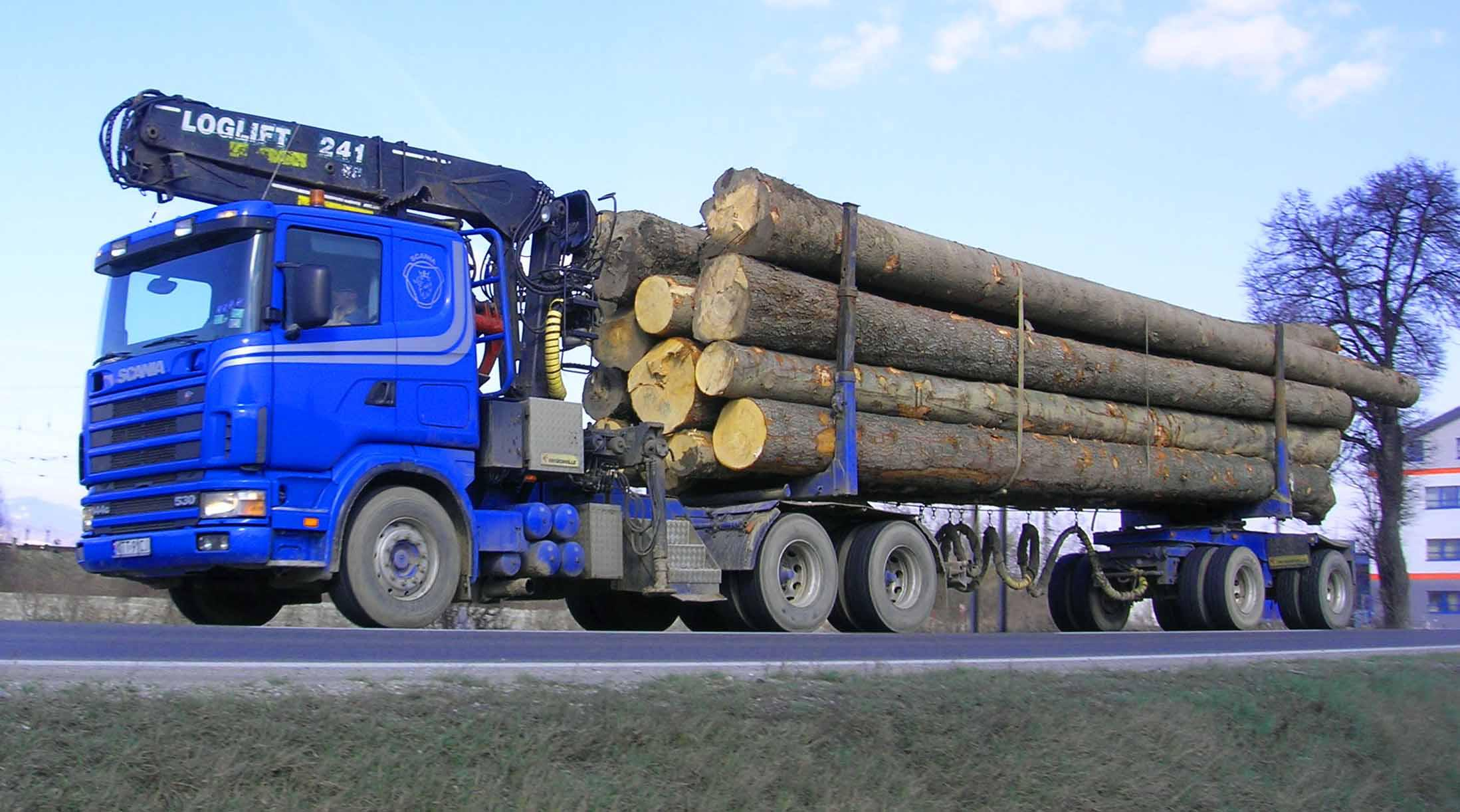
Scania tractor with Faymonville FlexMAX trailer hauling wooden logs.

Faymonville brand is specialized in manufacturing and selling specialized and unconventional trailers for oversize load transportation, which can handle 60 to 500 ton of payload. The brand is well around the world for its extendable trailers and hydraulic modular trailers Products.

=== Global ===
- MegaMAX
- GigaMAX
- VarioMAX
- VarioMAX Plus
- MultiMAX
- MultiMAX Plus
- ModulMAX
- CombiMAX
- TeleMAX
- FlexMAX
- CargoMAX
- TimberMAX
- FlexMAX
- FloatMAX
- PrefabMAX

=== North America ===
- StreetMAX
- MegaMAX-US
- TeleMAX-US
- MultiMAX-US
- HighwayMAX
- DualMAX

== Cometto ==
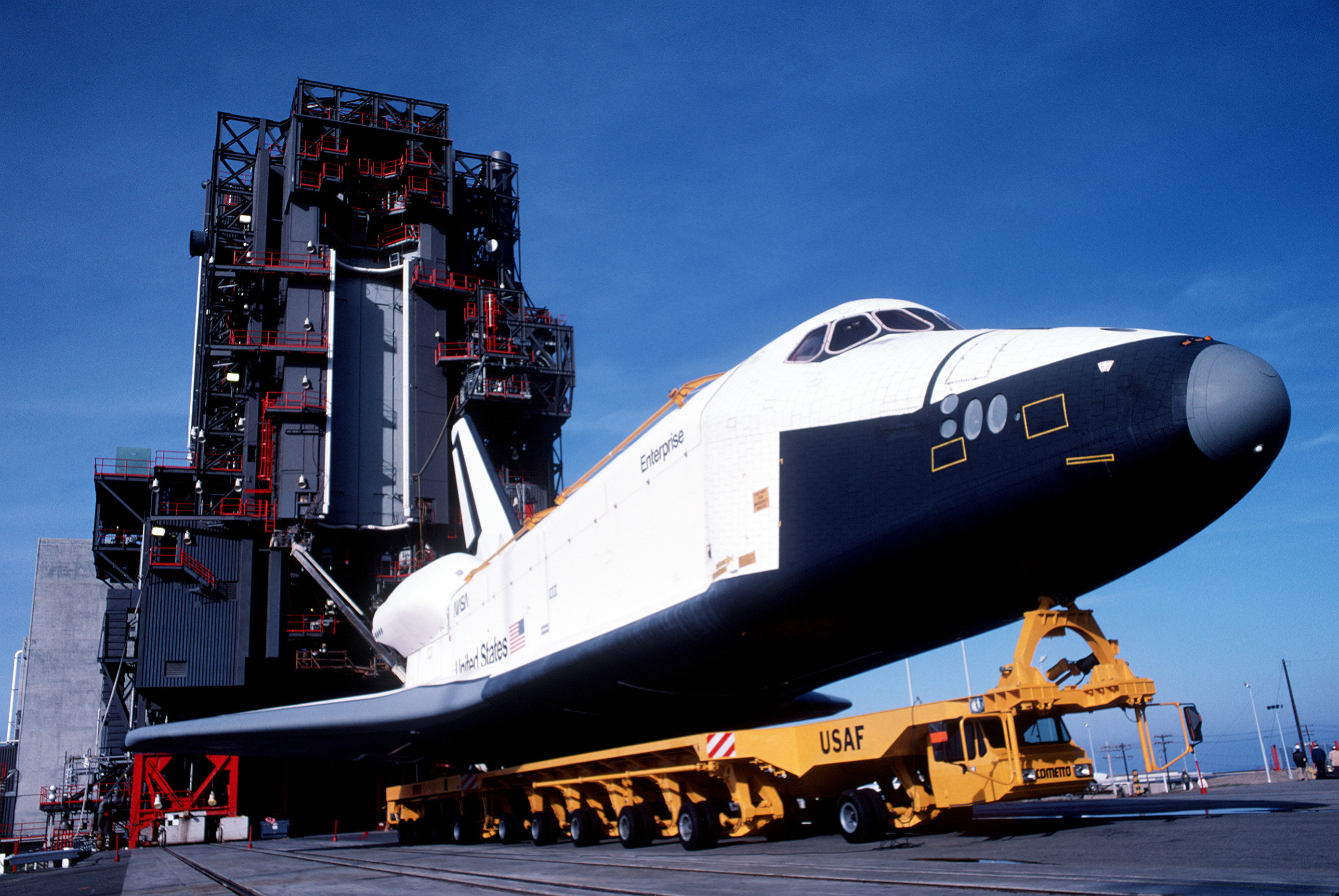
A Space shuttle being hauled on a special designed transporter by cometto at Vandenberg AFB Space Launch Complex 6.

Started in 1954 as workshop for vehicles, bridge cranes and systems in the name of Officine Cometto at Cuneo, Italy. Cometto was one of the first hydraulic trailer manufacturers in the world. The company showcased their first hydraulic modular trailer in 1963 Italian Motor Show, two modules consisting of 7 axle rows each having a combined payload capacity of 300 tons. In the early 1970s, Cometto and Crane Fruehauf started to sell and manufacture HMTs in England.

With constant growth, the company became a major manufacturer of industry transporter. Some remarkable transporters build by Cometto include 1100 ton capacity SPMT for Hyundai Heavy Industries and 3000 ton capacity SPMT for Nippon Express, which is till date its largest transporter ever built.

In 2017 Cometto partnered with Scania a Sweden-based truck manufacturer for the supply of engines to run their SPMT module power packs DC09 and DC13 family of engines will be used in regular modules and special modules will be supported by the heavy-duty V8 family engine.

In 2021 The Swiss Federal Roads Office developed a mobile bridge project to reduce conjunctions and keep the roads operating while they are being repaired. This project was named ASTRA, a gantry bridge consisting of 72 MSPE modules, eight SPMT modules and 16 ModulMAX SP-E modules powered by 22 power packs and 22 valve packs and controlled by two control cabins with the help of a satellite navigation system. The complete bridge measured 240 meters long when first operated at the road section between Recherswil and Luterbach in Switzerland.

=== Products ===
- MSPE
- ECO1000
- ECO500E/D
- ModulMAX SP-E
- BladeMAX
- SYT
- ETH/ETL
- MTH45

== See also ==
- SPMT
- Hydraulic modular trailer
- Heavy Hauler
- Goldhofer
- Transporter Industry International
