= Hydraulic modular trailer =

Trailer platform to transport overweight and oversize loads by road

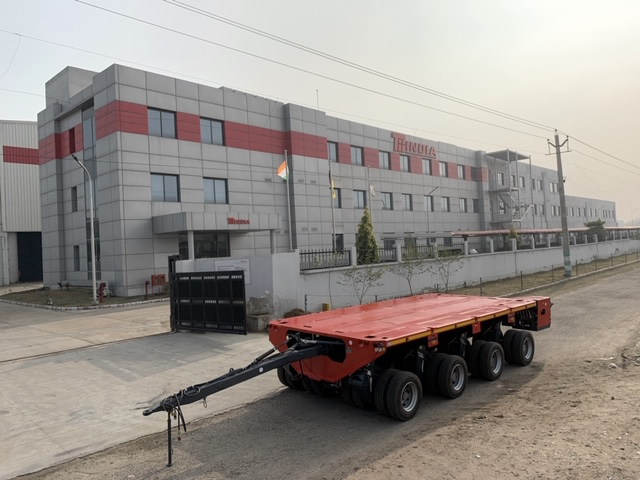
Tiiger four-axle HMT module at Transporter Industry International headquarters in Haryana, India

A hydraulic modular trailer (HMT) is a platform trailer unit that features swing axles, hydraulic suspension, independently steerable axles, two or more axle rows, compatibility to join two or more units longitudinally and laterally, and uses a power pack unit (PPU) to steer and adjust height. These trailer units are used to transport oversized loads, which are difficult to disassemble and are overweight. Trailers of this type are manufactured using high-tensile steel, which allows them to support heavy loads. They are operated by one or more ballast tractors that push or pull the trailer using a drawbar or gooseneck connection. This tractor-trailer arrangement is commonly referred to as a heavy hauler.

Typical loads include oil rig modules, bridge sections, buildings, ship sections, and industrial machinery such as generators and turbines. Also, militaries use HMT for tank transportation. There is a limited number of manufacturers who produce these heavy-duty trailers because the market share of oversized loads is very thin when we talk about the overall transportation industry. There are self-powered units of hydraulic modular trailers, which are called Self-propelled modular transporters (SPMTs), which are used when the ballast tractors are unable to be used due to space.

== History ==
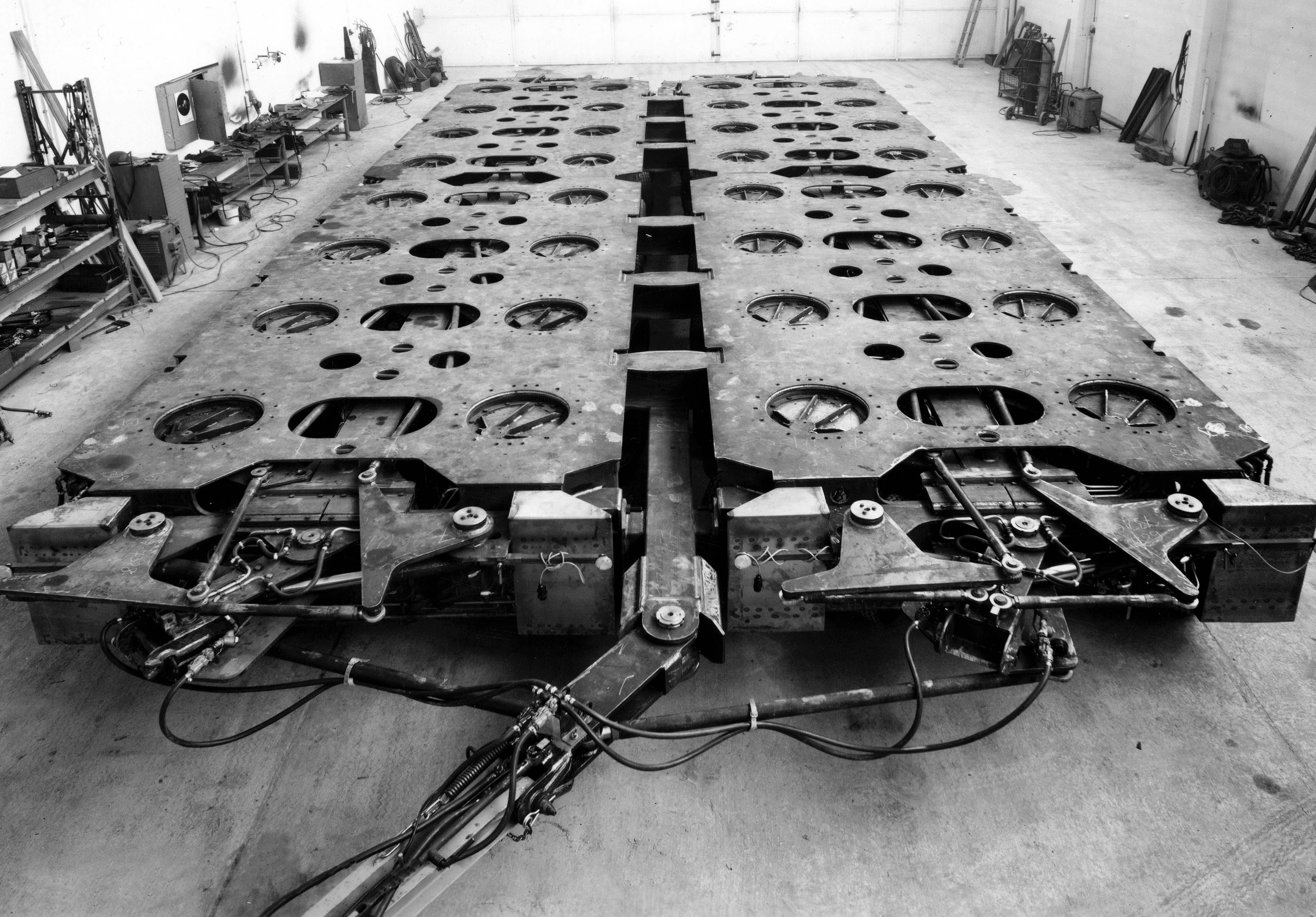
Goldhofer THPS HMT in two-lane configuration in 1973

In 1953 H.P. Wynn of Robert Wynn and Sons Ltd a Shaftesbury-based Guinness World Records-winning heavy haulage company collaborated with Cranes Trailers Limited from Dereham to build a lowered, stronger and hydraulically suspended trailer to move large oversize loads. Cranes Trailers Limited came up with a prototype trailer which was named "Trailer 333" but they were not confident about its operation and the loading platform was higher than the expectation.

Later Wynn headed to Willy Scheuerle, a German trailer specialist, to manufacturer a similar trailer with a lower platform height and fully operational hydraulic axles. By 1956 Scheuerle completed the manufacturing of the first hydraulic modular trailer and testing was done at Pfedelbach plant. Next year four-axle, 32-wheeled modules were delivered to Robert Wynn and Sons Ltd.

In 1962, Cranes Trailers Limited developed two four-axle, 32-wheeled modules for Pickfords, a London-based heavy haulage company. With a combined payload capacity of 160 tons on a total of eight axles and 64 wheels, the modules incorporated hydraulic suspensions, and each axle was interlinked with a mechanical steering system at an operational height that varied from 2.9 to 3.11 feet (0.88 to 0.95 m). The modules had drawbar coupling, which could be coupled at either or both ends (coupling at both ends allowed for a push-pull combination).

In 1963, Goldhofer developed modular trailers in Europe for heavy haulers. In the same year, Cometto developed a 300-ton capacity module in a 14-axle, seven-row configuration. Scheuerle also demonstrated its modules at events in 1967, and later King Truck Equipment Ltd. signed an agreement with Scheuerle that gave them exclusive manufacturing rights to produce their trailers in the UK.

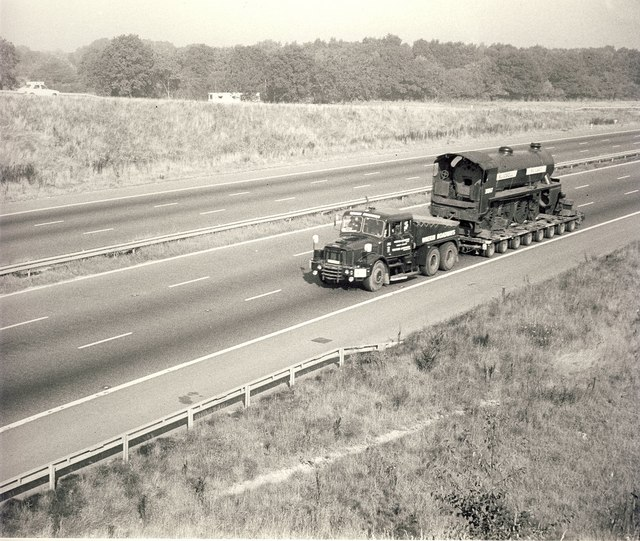
A locomotive being hauled to Woodham Brothers yard on an eight-axle HMT coupled via drawbar to a Scammell contractor ballast tractor on A27 highway, England in 1978

In 1971, King Truck Equipment Ltd. demonstrated two custom-built heavy-haul trailers for Pickfords. Each unit could carry up to 150 tons on six axle rows with a total of 48 wheels and was primarily operated with Pickfords' Scammell ballast tractors using a drawbar coupling. The trailers had independent suspension and steering abilities via the Petter twin-cylinder diesel engine used as a PPU.

In the 1970s, manufacturers began developing HMTs in response to the limitations of conventional low loaders. To comply with new regulations and safety requirements, manufacturers recognized the need for additional axles to distribute payload weight, and HMTs emerged as the most effective solution. Manufacturers adopted hydraulic suspension for its efficient design and adjustable characteristics, rather than using mechanical leaf springs or air suspension. High-tensile steel was selected instead of aluminum because trailer weight reduction was not a priority for HMTs, which have their own payload capacity independent of the ballast tractor. The main weakness of both early and modern HMTs has been their tires, a limitation that remains significant. Self-propelled modular transporters (SPMTs) use solid tires for this reason, although solid tires are unsuitable for HMTs since they operate at higher speeds.

== Specifications ==
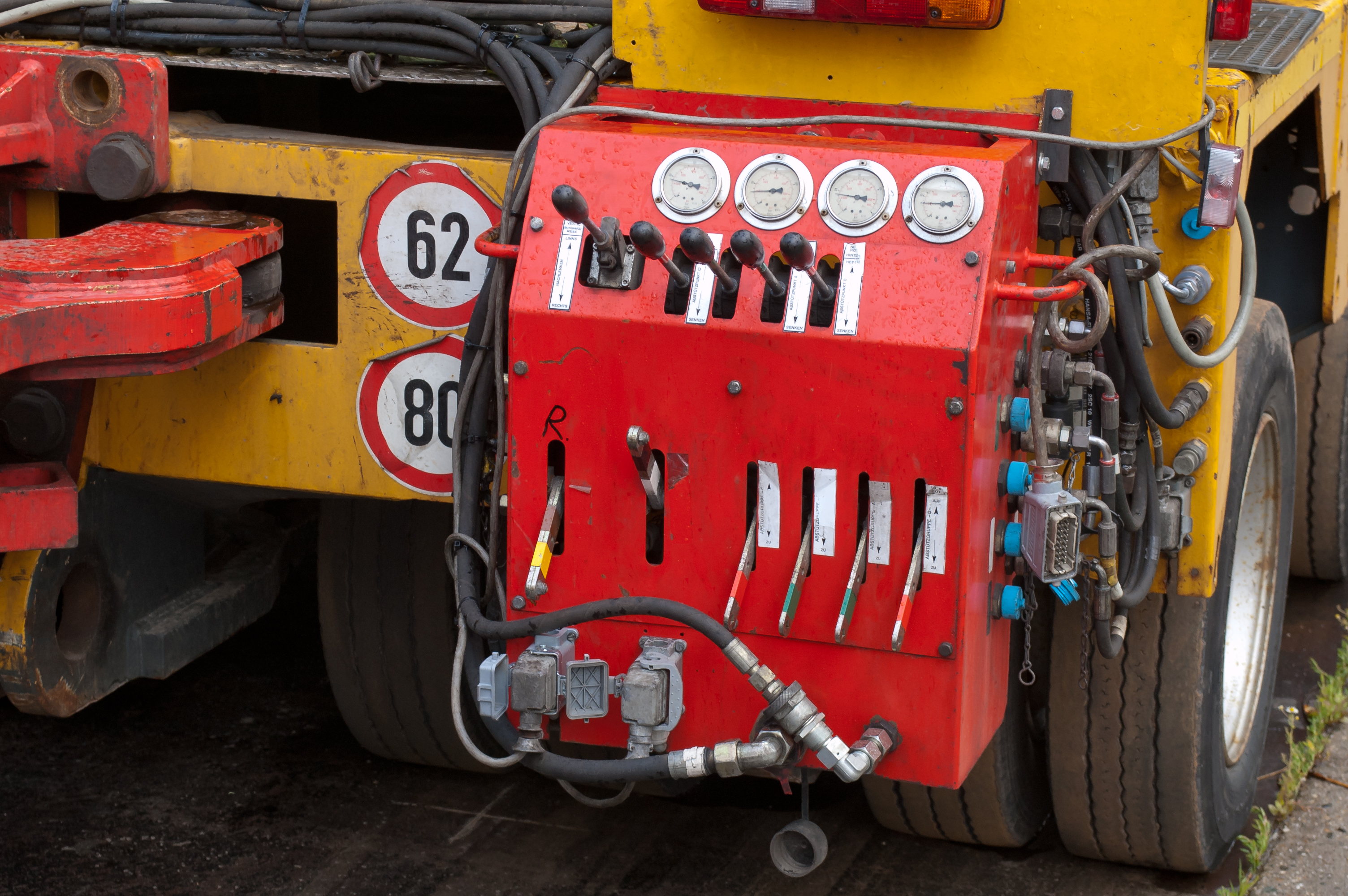
Steering and suspension controller unit mounted on a Scheuerle HMT

The number of axles on an HMT is not specified; two-, three-, four-, five-, six-, and eight-axle units are manufactured. Multiple units can be coupled longitudinally and laterally to transport a heavier load; each axle has a lifting capacity ranging from 18 tons to 45 tons. With a steering capacity of 50 to 60 degrees. Some combinations require a trailer operator who controls steering and height adjustments of the trailer via a controller, which is modular and can be mounted at the front end or rear end of the trailer. Some large combinations may also have a cabin for the operator, while typical combinations have a seat attached to the controller.

Hydraulic cylinders are used for steering and suspension of the trailer. Each axle has an individual suspension cylinder steering rod, which is connected to the main steering cylinder at the front end of the trailer. This steering cylinder allows the axles to steer in the same direction at the same time. One row of axles consists of two turntables, two knees, two suspension cylinders, and four to eight wheels attached to a high-strength metal platform. Steering and suspension cylinders are hydraulically operated using hydraulic fluid through a hosepipe from the hydraulic tank, which is located near the PPU. The PPU, which supplies hydraulic pressure that is used to operate the steering system and the suspensions fore-and-aft articulation, produces approximately 18-25 horsepower. PPUs are manufactured in both petrol and diesel configurations by companies such as Kohler, Yanmar, and Hatz.

Multiple units of HMT can be interconnected longitudinally by pins and interconnecting couplings mounted in the center of the chassis in the front and rear. To interconnect them laterally, they are bolted on the side wall of the chassis. HMTs can not move themselves. There are two ways by which an HMT can be coupled with a tractor unit that can push and pull the trailer; these are gooseneck and drawbar.

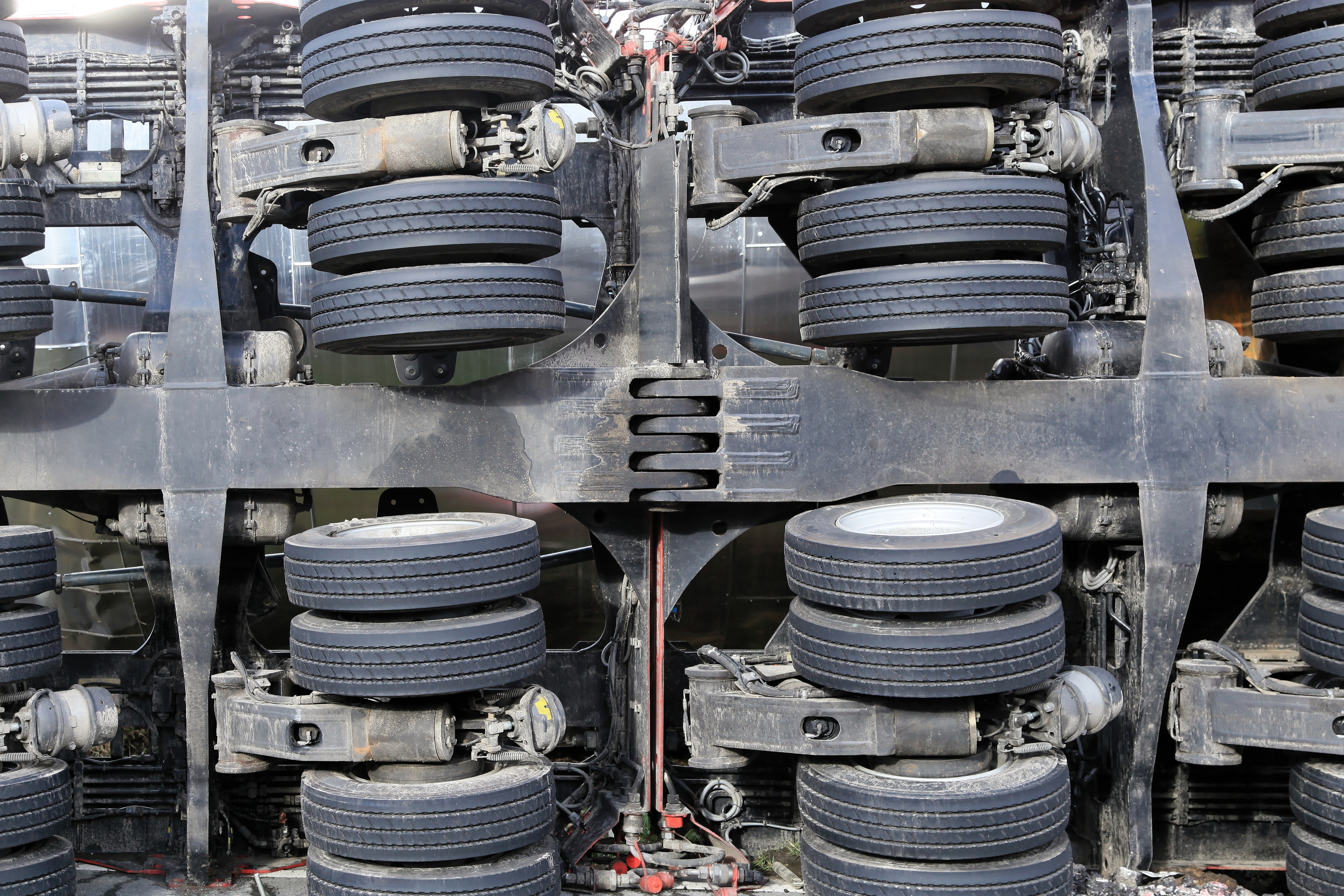
Under view of a Tii HMT with visible axle configuration and interconnecting coupling after an accident in Sögel, Germany

Gooseneck is the most common coupling used in the industry. A swan-shaped coupling is coupled to the trailer and the tractor via connection of the trailer pin and tractor fifth wheel. This coupling can be hydraulically adjusted to suit the tractor's height. The steering controls are also connected to the coupling. Goosenecks are easy to use and give benefits such as using conventional tractors. The gooseneck coupling has two major drawbacks: it can't be applied in a two-file or side-by-side HMT configuration (limiting the payload), and it can't be applied in a push-and-pull configuration. Goosenecks are manufactured by the trailer manufacturers.

Drawbar is the most efficient and economical coupling which consists of an A-shaped frame with an I-shaped loop which is coupled to the trailer and connected to a ballast tractor using a towing hitch of the tractor. This coupling is widely used in developing countries because of its economical cost. Unlike gooseneck, this coupling can be applied to side by side and push & pull configuration which, but this coupling cannot be connected to a typical tractor, it requires a ballast tractor which has a ballast box instead of a fifth wheel and tow hitches in the rear and front. Draw bars and tow hitches are manufactured by companies like Jost and BPW.

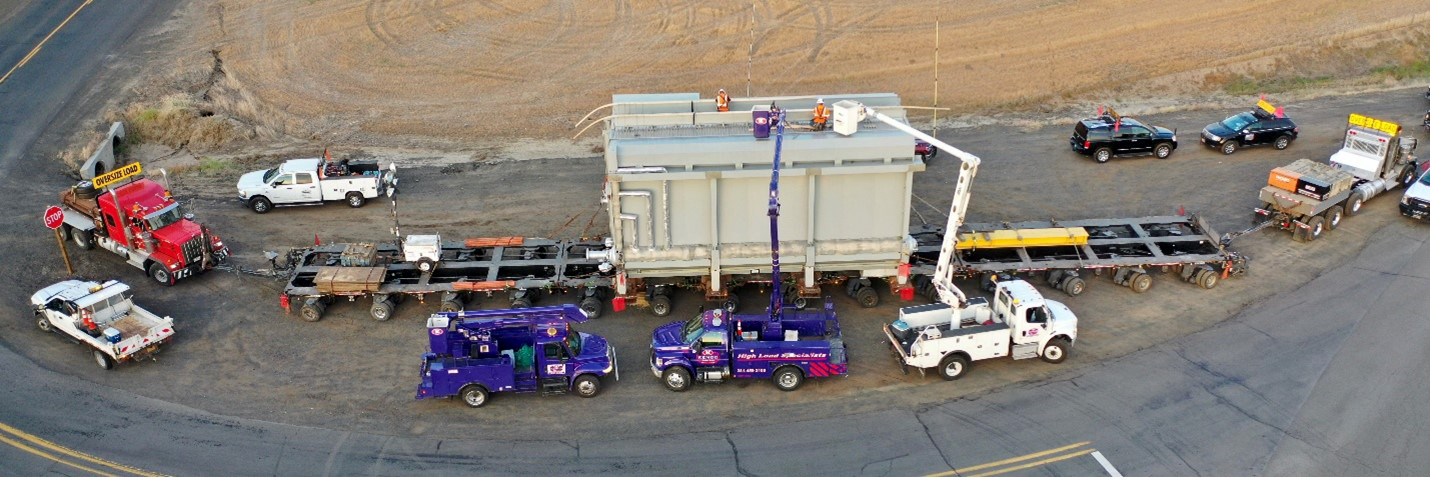
A 14 axle Dual lane HMT with push and pull configuration with pilot vehicles and aerial work platform in Eastern Oregon

Since 2005 in the US, HMTs have had extra features and design changes, which include widening axles and a halfway folding system. Due to different road regulations in different states, almost all manufacturers have adopted the US design and developed a product for the US market. These HMT trailers are named dual-lane trailers, which comes from the widening characteristic of the trailer. Dual-lane trailers have the ability to change their width from 13 to 20 feet (4.0 to 6.1 m) wide to make transport of empty trailers easy and also comply with state regulations when required.

Manufacturers have developed new HMT modules that have drive axles that are powered by a much more powerful PPU, sometimes even 1000 hp. These modules make gradients easier for heavy load transportation by reducing the need for extra tractors for heavy loads. This is accomplished because the PPU powers the modules which assist the ballast tractor.

== Accessories ==
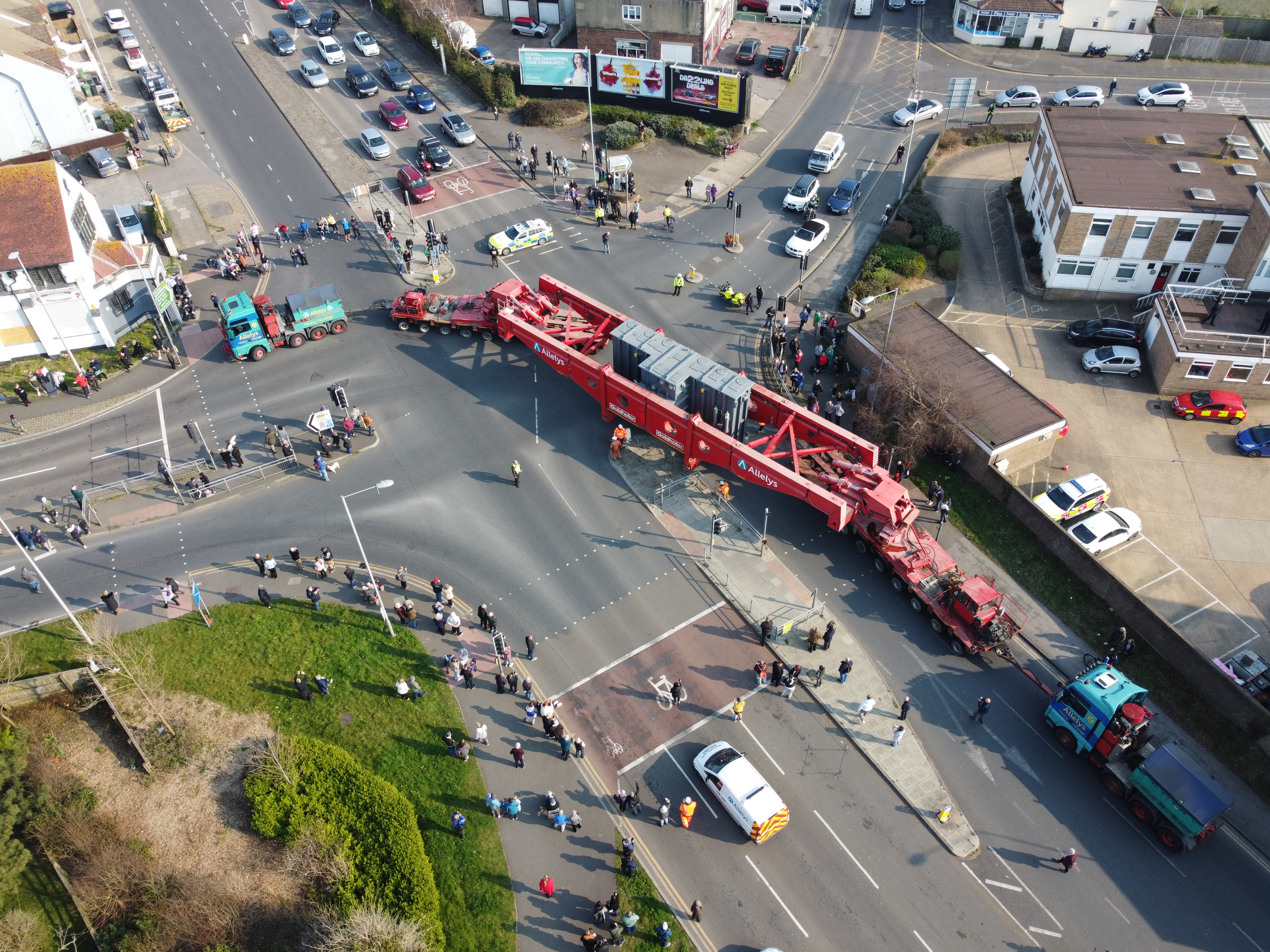
Allelys HMT with girder bridge configuration, hauling heavy load with two MAN ballast tractors

- Gooseneck
- Draw bar
- Drop Deck
- Vessel Bridge
- Intermediate spacer
- Excavator deck
- Extendable spacer
- Turntables (bolster)
- Blade Lifter
- Tower adapter
- Girder frame
- Trailer power assist

== Manufacturers ==
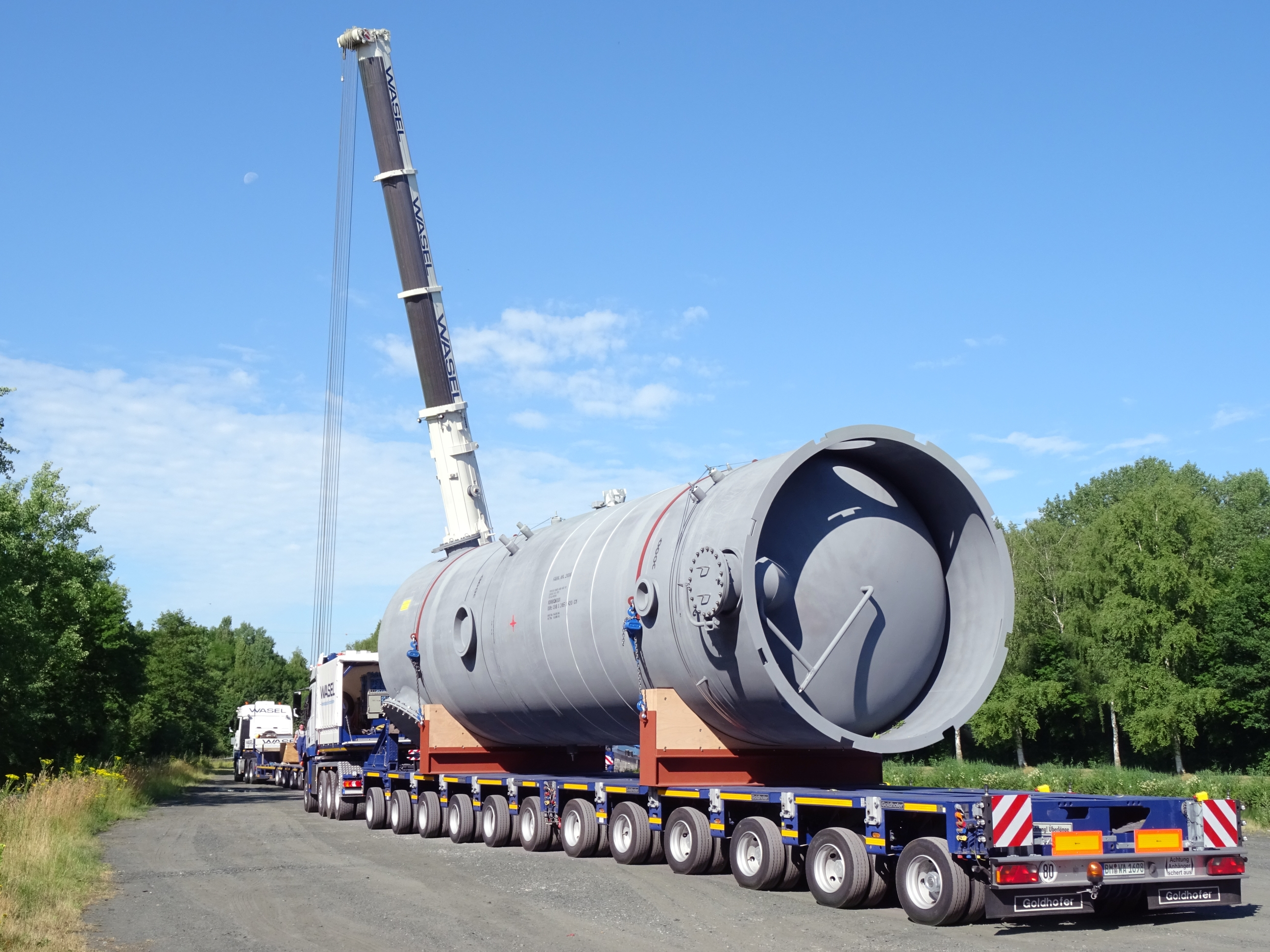
Goldhofer THP-SL hydraulic modular trailer with oversize load being pulled by Mercedes-Benz Actros ballast tractor via drawbar

- BEML
- Broshuis
- Cometto
- DOLL Fahrzeugbau
- Faymonville
- Goldhofer
- Kamag
- Leonardo DRS
- Nicolas
- Scheuerle
- Taskers of Andover
- Tiiger

== Operators ==
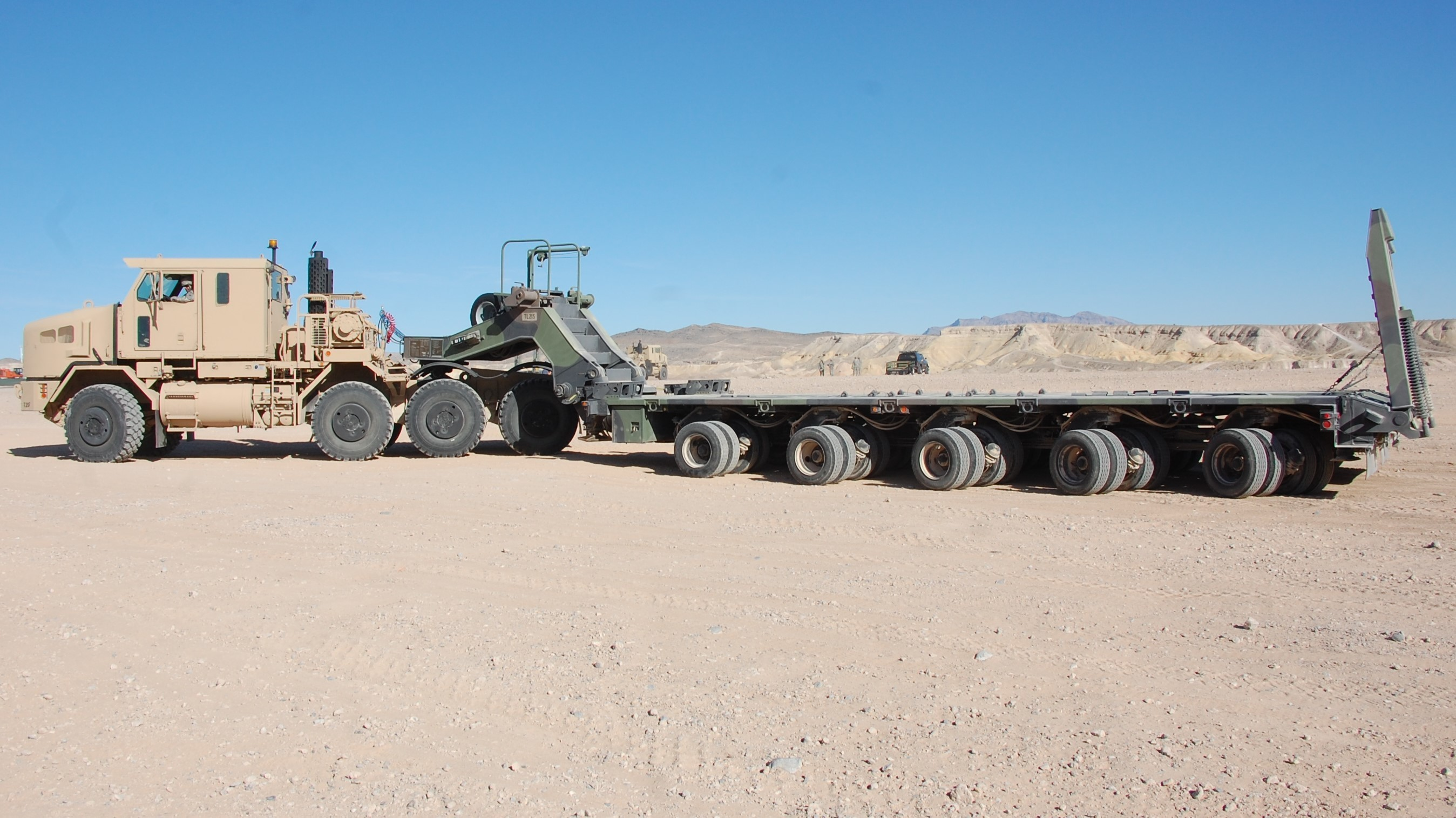
United States Army five-axle M1000 HMT module by Leonardo DRS coupled with Oshkosh M1070 tractor at Las Vegas

- ALE
- Sarens
- Mammoet
- Lampson International
- Pickfords
- Alstom
- ALE
- CLP Group
- Collett & Sons
- Omega morgan
- United States Army
- Indian Army
- British Army
- Republic of Korea Armed Forces
- French Army
- Italian Army
- Turkish Armed Forces

== Gallery ==
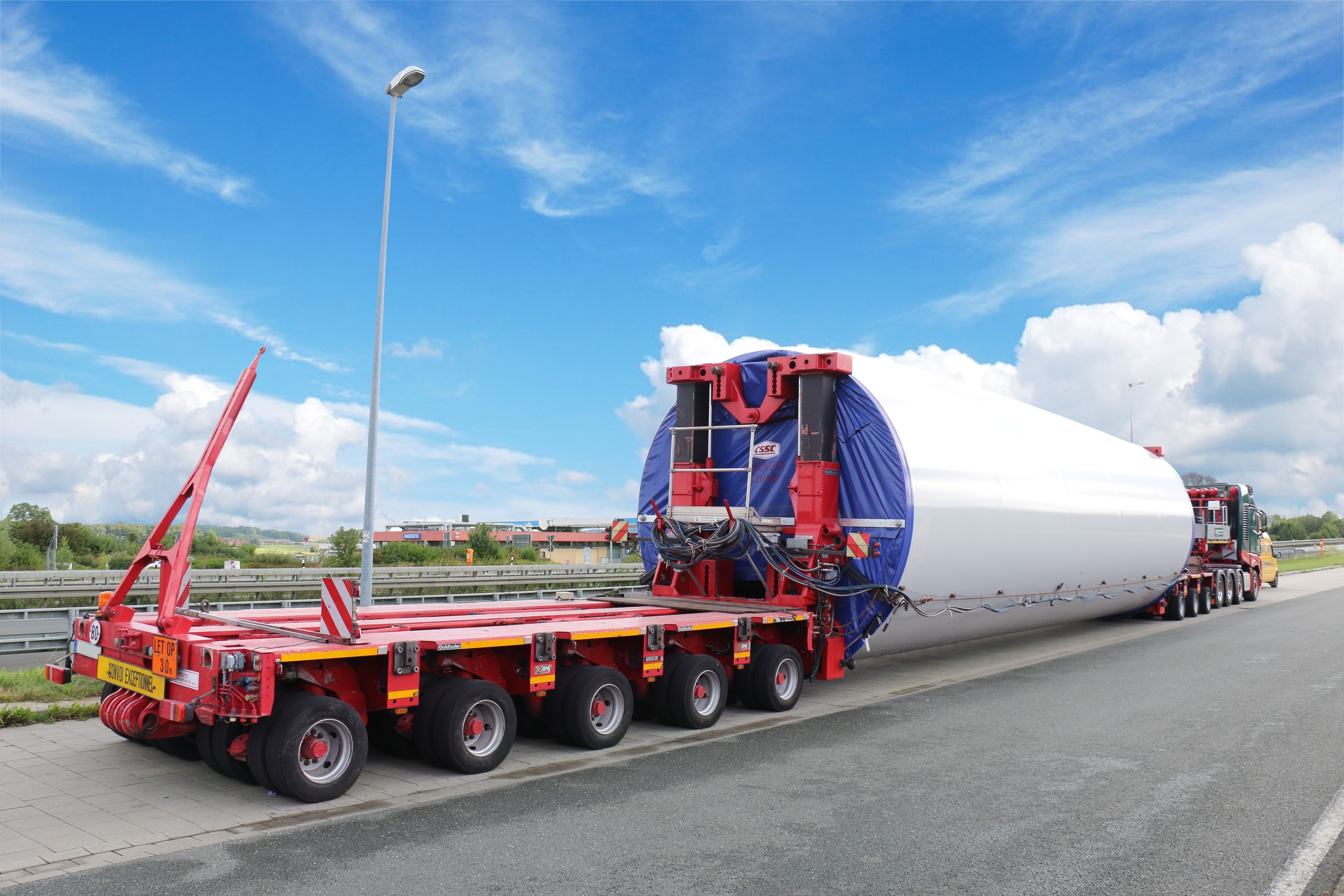
Windmill tower section being transported using tower adapter configuration

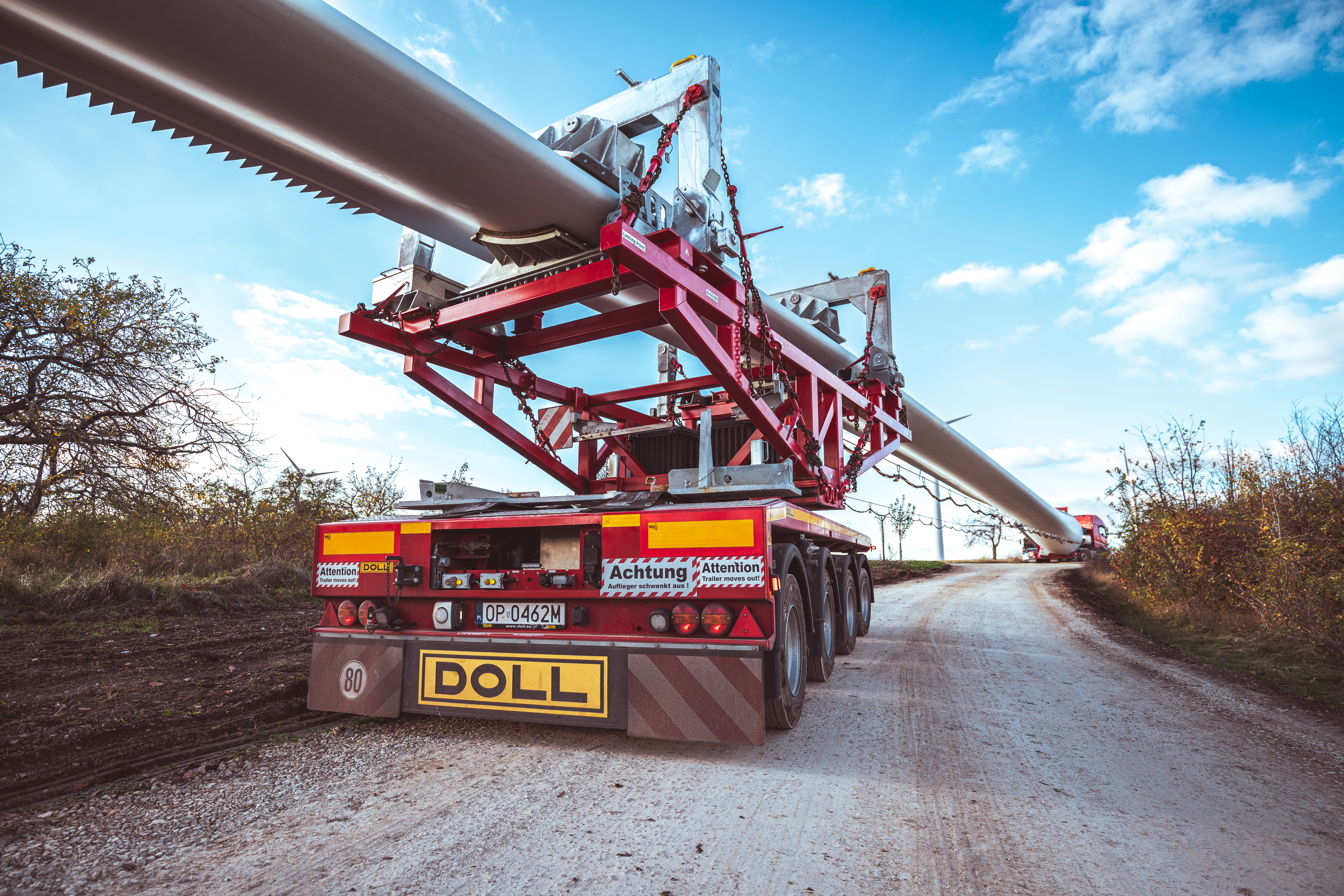
DOLL self steering blade transporter dolly

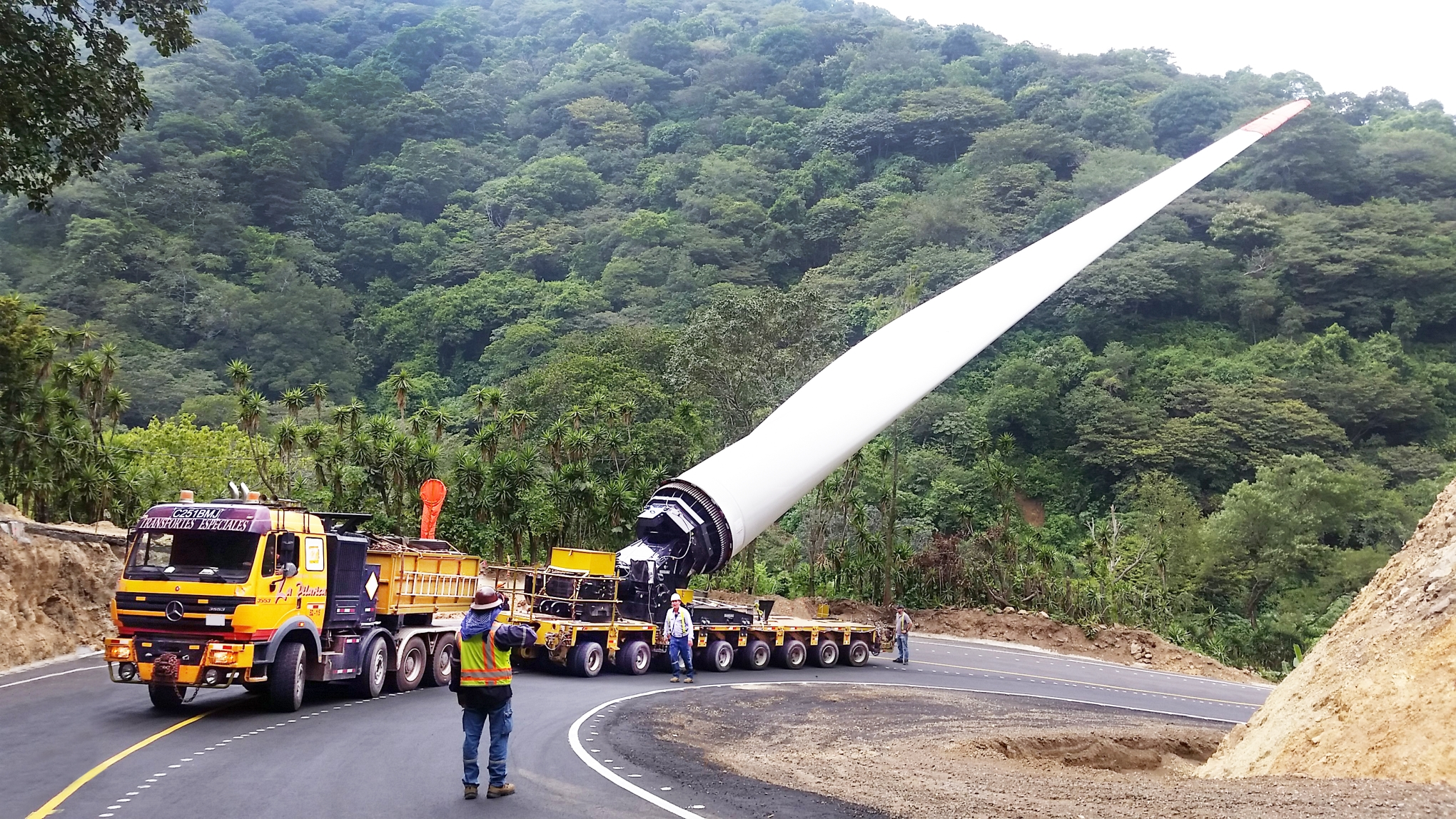
Goldhofer FTV blade lifter being pulled by a Mercedes-Benz SK 3553 tractor

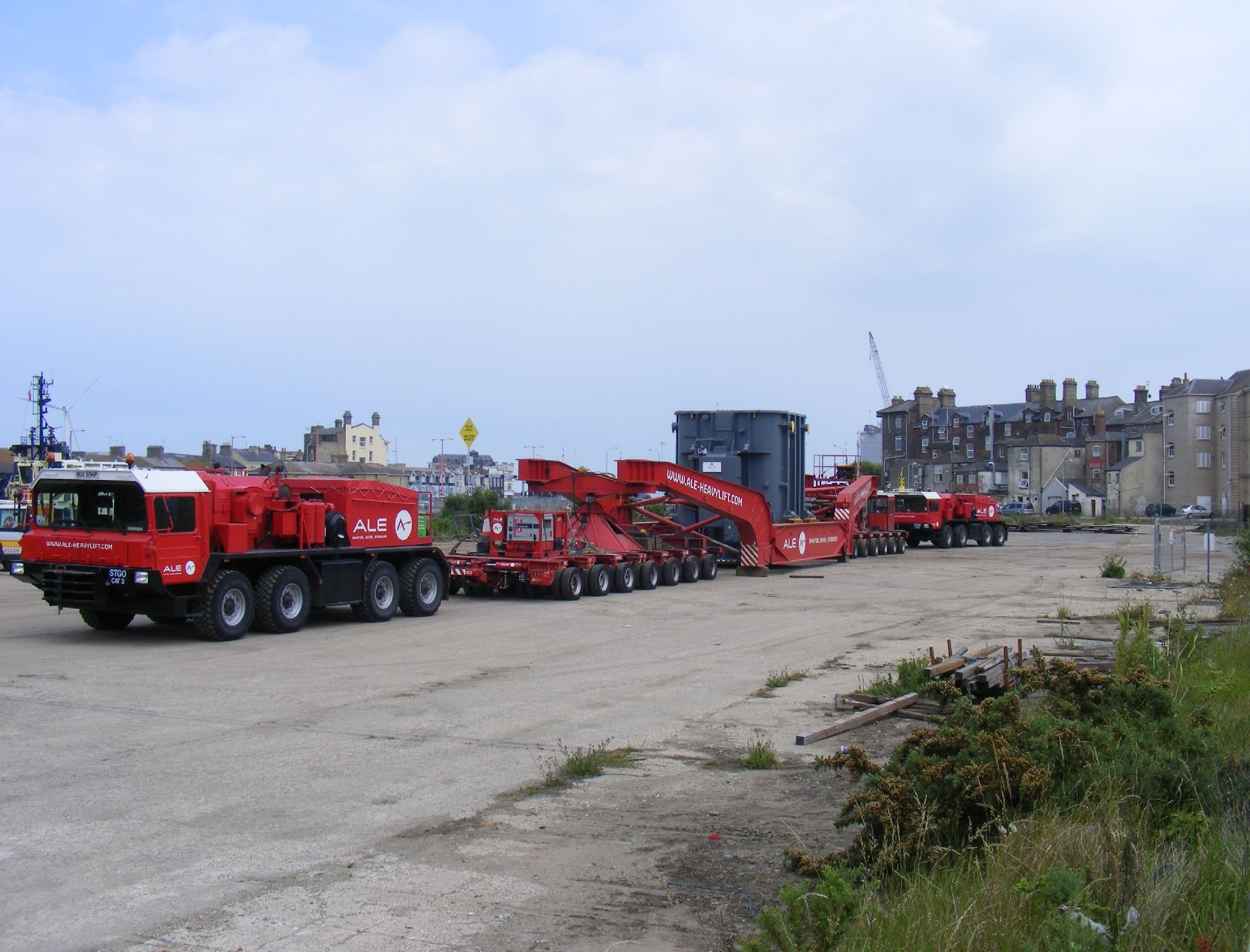
ALE girder bridge with trojan tractors in push and pull configuration

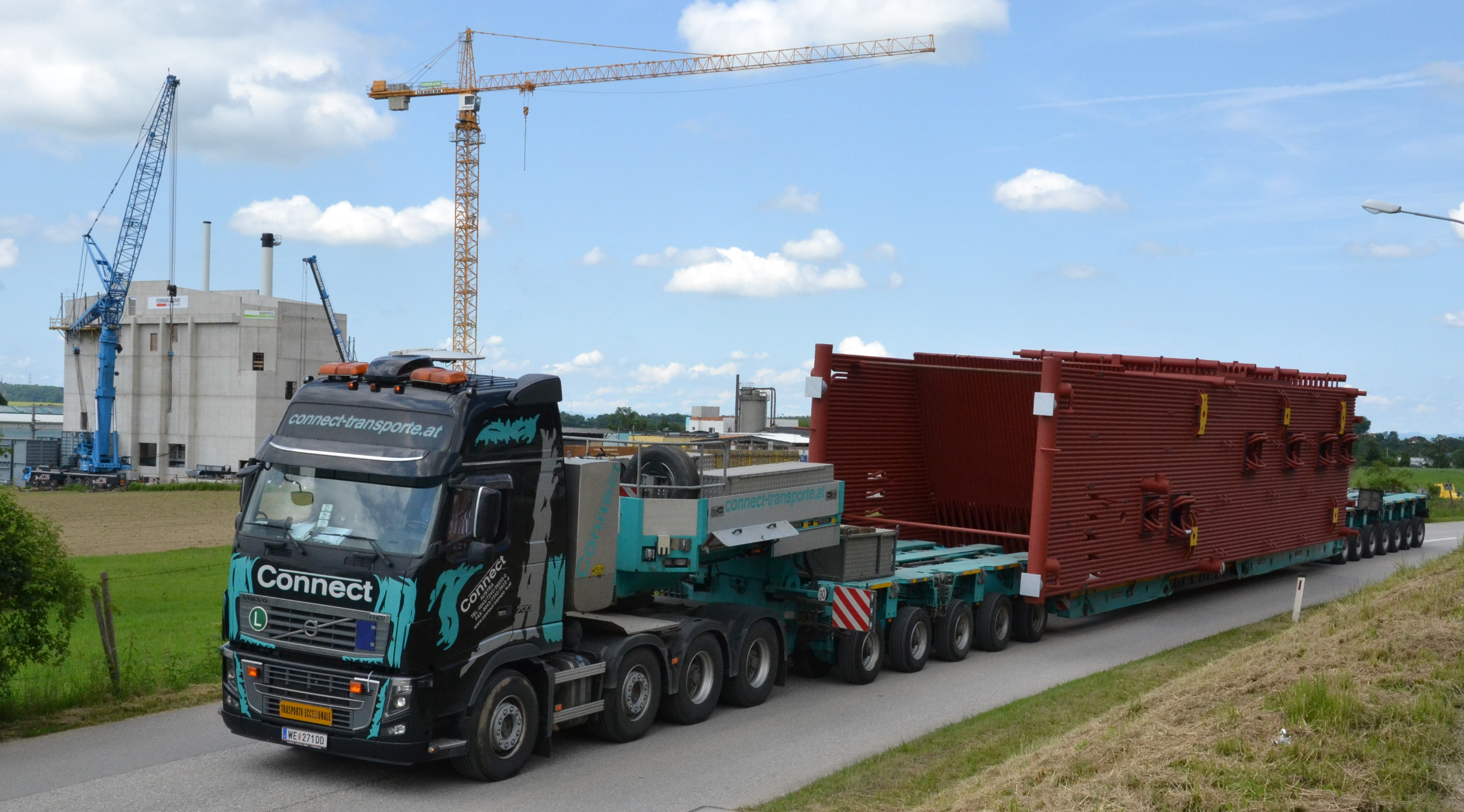
Volvo tractor with drop deck configuration moving oversize load

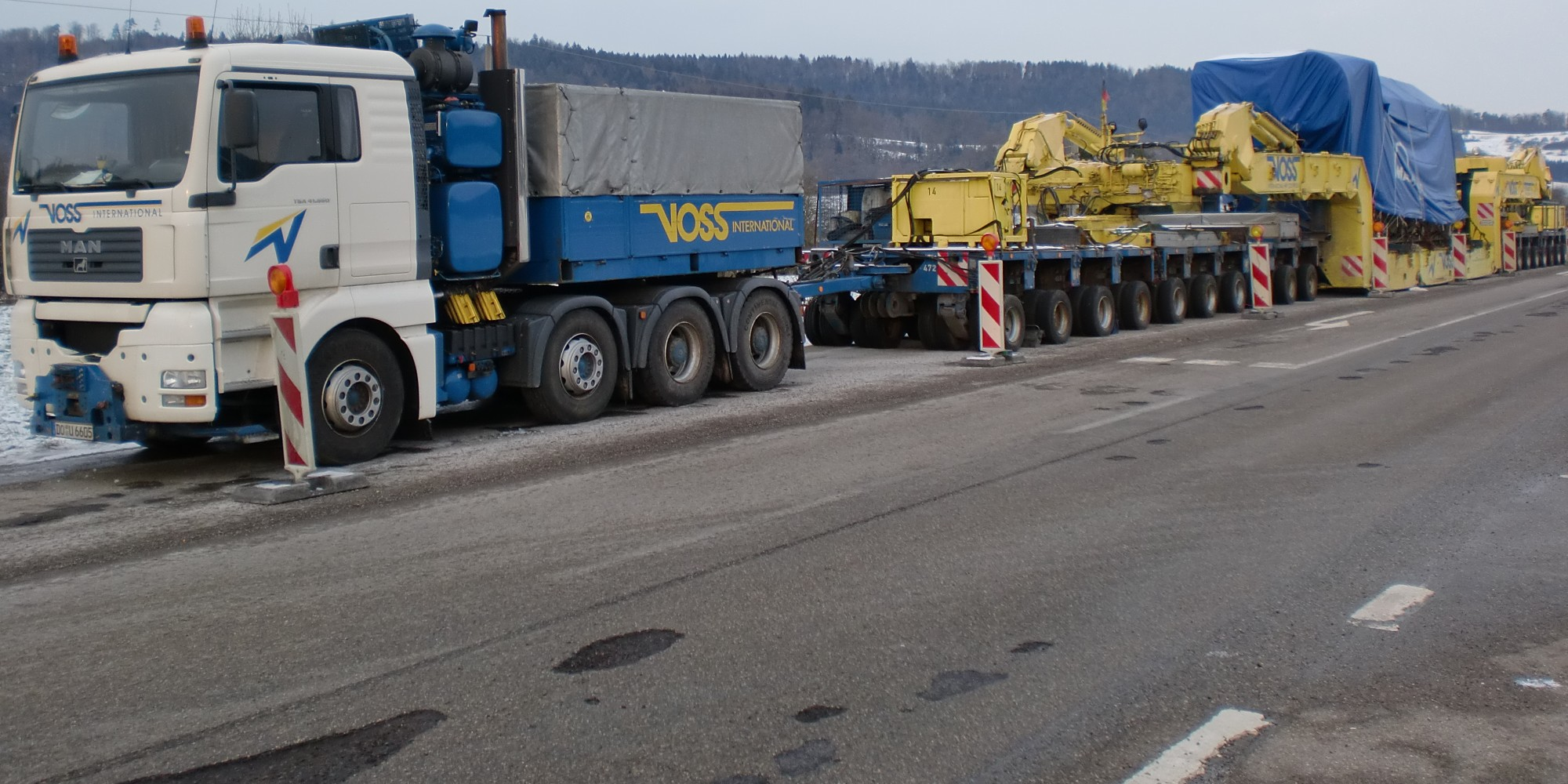
MAN tractors with vessel deck configuration

== See also ==
- Heavy hauler
- Tractor unit
- Ringfeder
- Ballast tractor
- Transporter Industry International
- Faymonville Group
