= Heavy hauler =

Large transporter for moving oversized loads

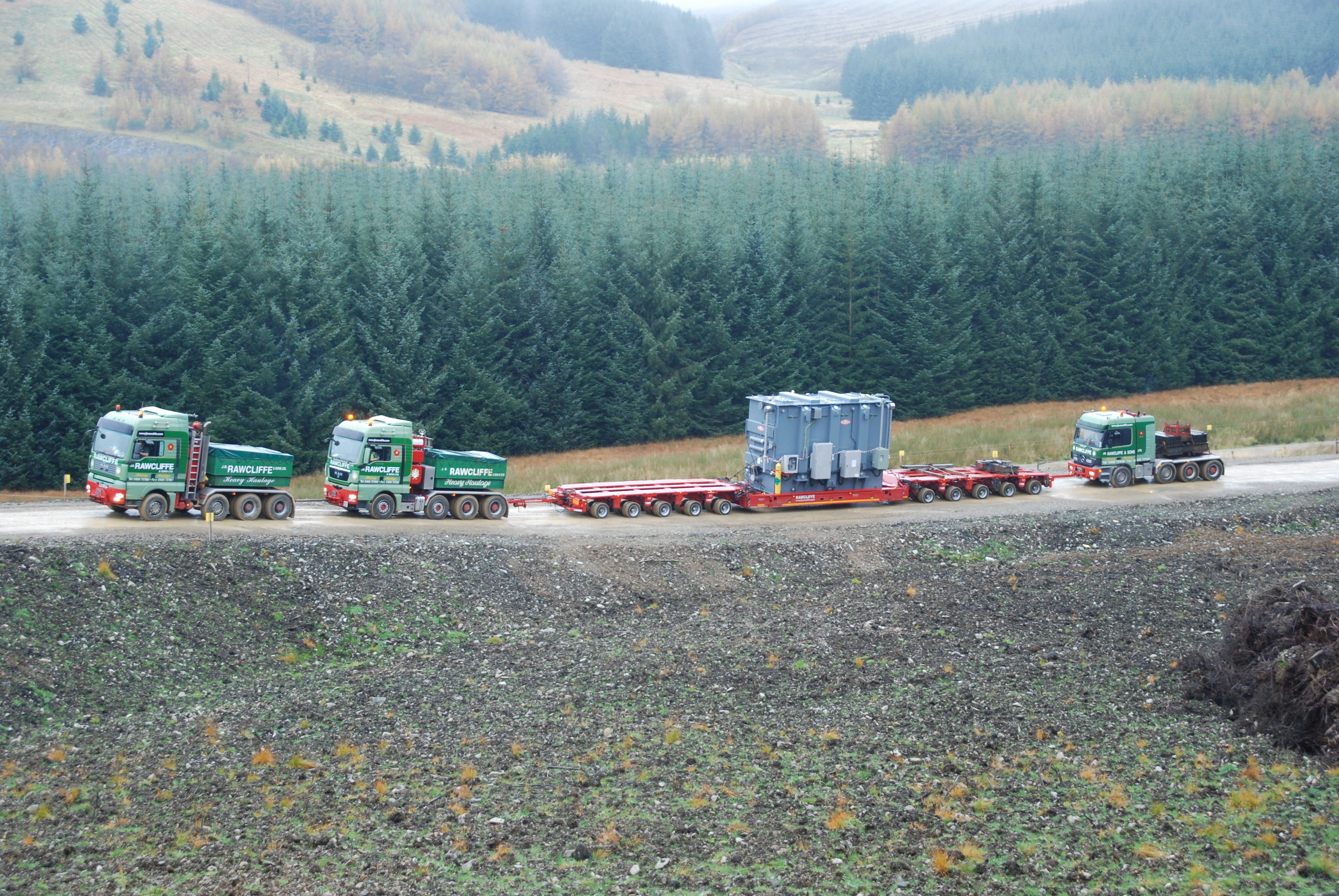
Two MAN SE ballast tractors pulling and one Mercedes pushing a 100,000 kg (220,000 lb) transformer on 10-axle lowboy trailer

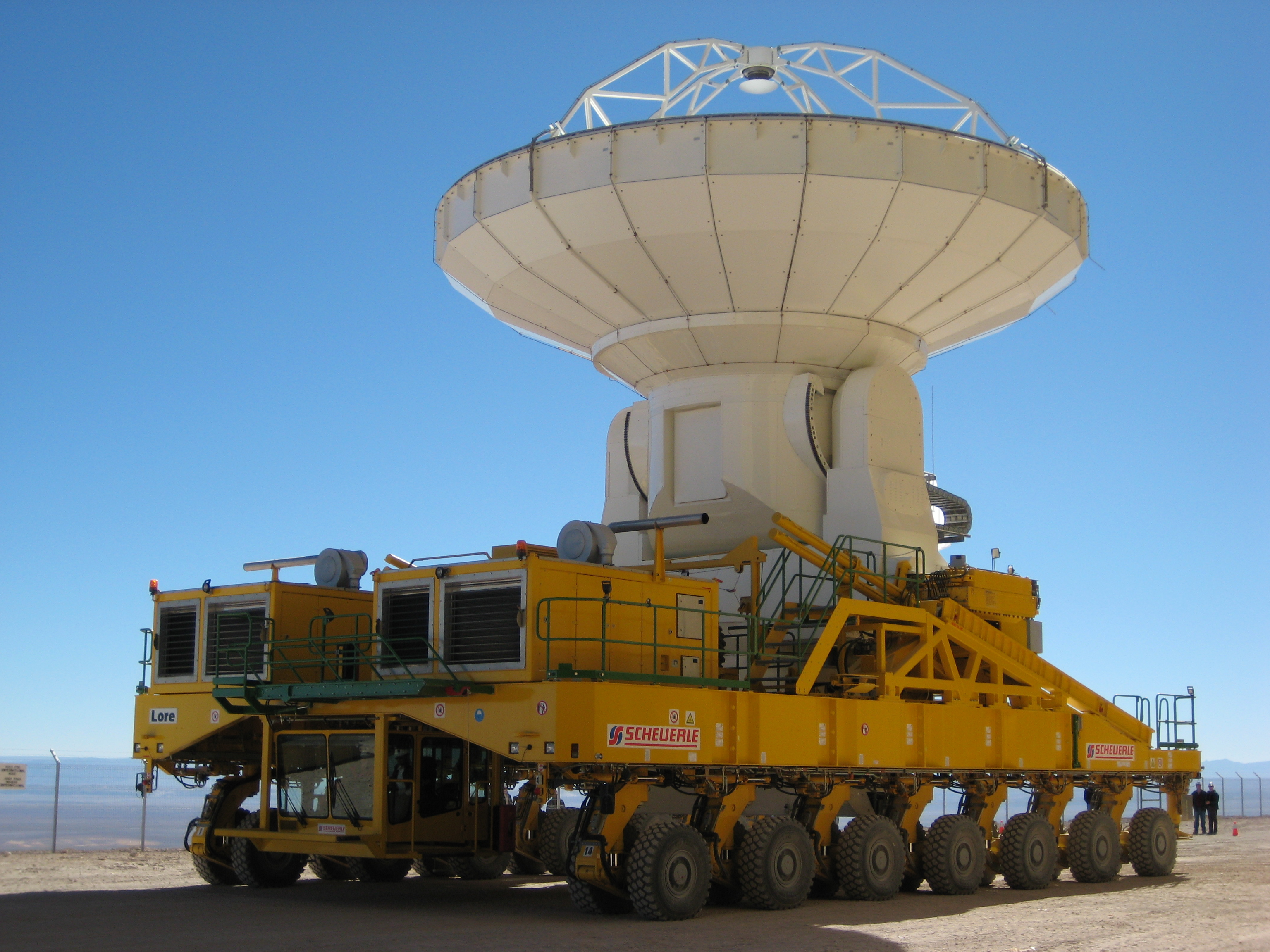
ALMA antenna in transit on a self-propelled modular transporter

A heavy hauler is a very large transporter for moving oversize loads too large for road travel without an escort and special permit.

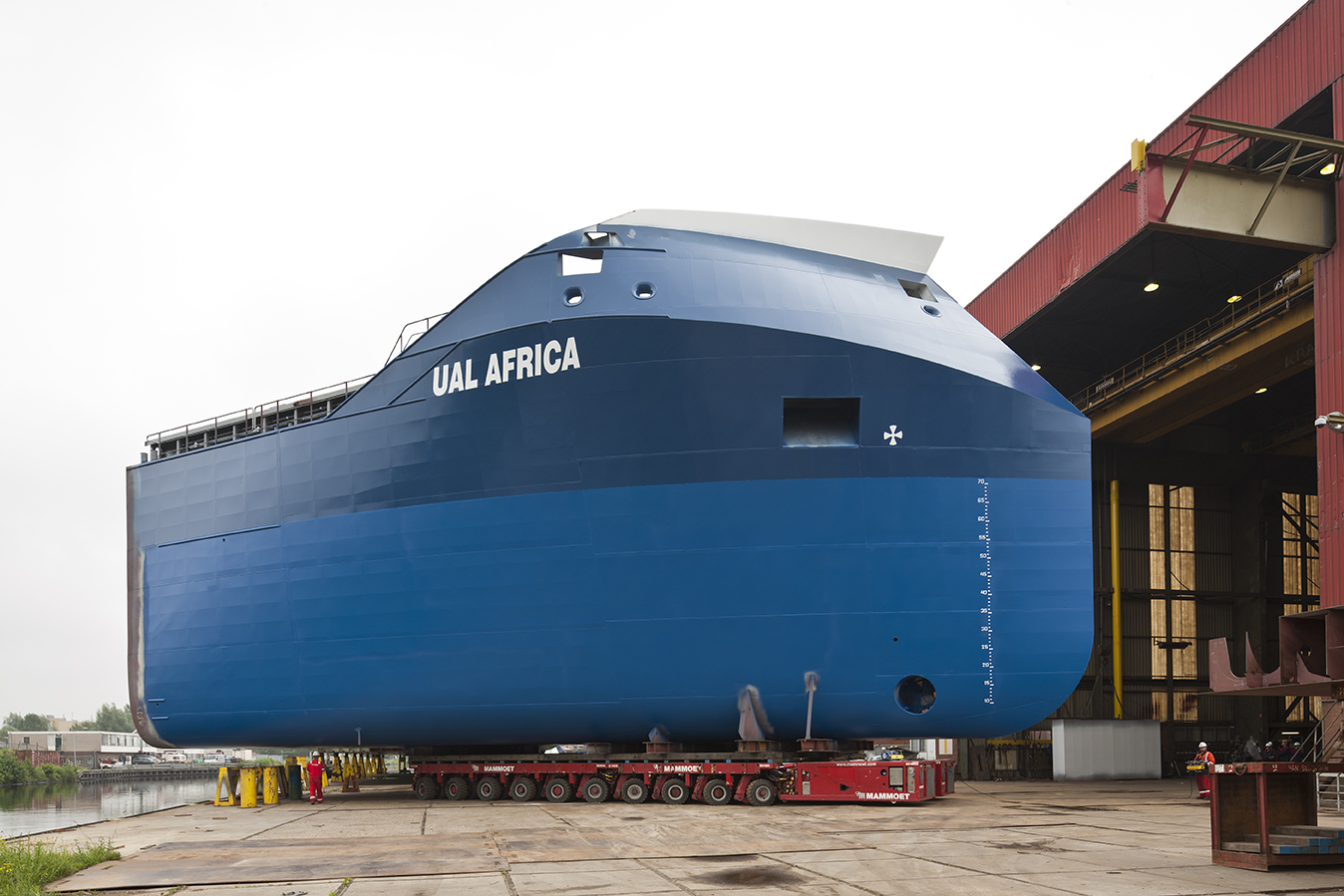
A Mammoet SPMT moves a large ship section.

A heavy hauler typically consists of a Ballast Tractor and a hydraulic modular trailer, or using a 6x4 tractor unit with a lift axle pulling a removable gooseneck trailer or double-drop trailer. Some trailers may have independently steerable wheels, and several might be towed by one or more tractor units in a train.

Self-propelled modular transporters (SPMT), some featuring a dozen or more self-steering axles with scores of rubber tires to spread out a load, are increasingly being manufactured. Working in coordinated teams, heavy haulers are able to carry loads exceeding 100 tons.

== Applications ==
In some cases, a heavy hauler is designed and constructed to move a particular load on a one-off or short-term basis. An example is the self-propelled antenna transporter for the ALMA radio telescope project, a 130-tonne (130-long-ton; 140-short-ton) 28-wheeled rigid vehicle designed to carry and place 115-tonne (113-long-ton; 127-short-ton) radio telescope antennas up a mountain to an altitude of 5,000 m (16,400 ft). Girder bridge (lowboy) trailers are another specialist heavy hauler, specifically for the transport of large power transformers.

Typical loads moved by heavy haulers under escort on highways include giant boilers and pressure vessels used in the chemical industry, industrial plants, prefabricated sections for construction projects, giant power transformers, turbines, and houses (generally made of timber).

The term "heavy hauler" may also be used to refer to off-road dump trucks and ore carriers used in mining and construction with capacities up to 400 tonnes (390 long tons; 440 short tons), or an airplane that has been especially constructed for moving heavy materials.

There are some shipbuilding companies using SPMT for carrying ship parts and constructing ships in China. They have saved millions of dollars formerly spent transporting loads using gantry cranes.

In recent decades, technological advances in heavy-haul logistics have improved the safety and precision of moving oversized loads. Operators use multi-axle and extendable trailers, hydraulic modular systems, and computer-assisted steering to manage extreme weight and length. Route planning software, GPS tracking, and real-time communication help ensure compliance with federal and state permits while minimizing operational risks. Modern heavy-haul operations also emphasize safety standards established by the Federal Motor Carrier Safety Administration (FMCSA) and Department of Transportation (DOT), covering vehicle inspections, load securement, and escort coordination.

== See also ==
- Ballast tractor
- Construction equipment
- HET
- Self-propelled modular transporter
- Tank transporter
- Hydraulic modular trailer
