= Self-propelled modular transporter =

Vehicle for carrying very large objects

A self-propelled modular transporter or sometimes self-propelled modular trailer (SPMT) is a platform heavy hauler with a large array of wheels which is an upgraded version of a hydraulic modular trailer. SPMTs are used for transporting massive objects, such as large bridge sections, oil refining equipment, cranes, motors, spacecraft, entire buildings, and other objects that are too big or heavy for trucks. Ballast tractors can however provide traction and braking for the SPMTs on inclines and descents.

SPMTs are used in many industry sectors worldwide such as the construction and oil industries, in the shipyard and offshore industry, for road transportation, on plant construction sites and even for moving oil platforms. They have begun to be used to replace bridge spans in the United States, Europe, Asia and more recently Canada.

== Specifications ==
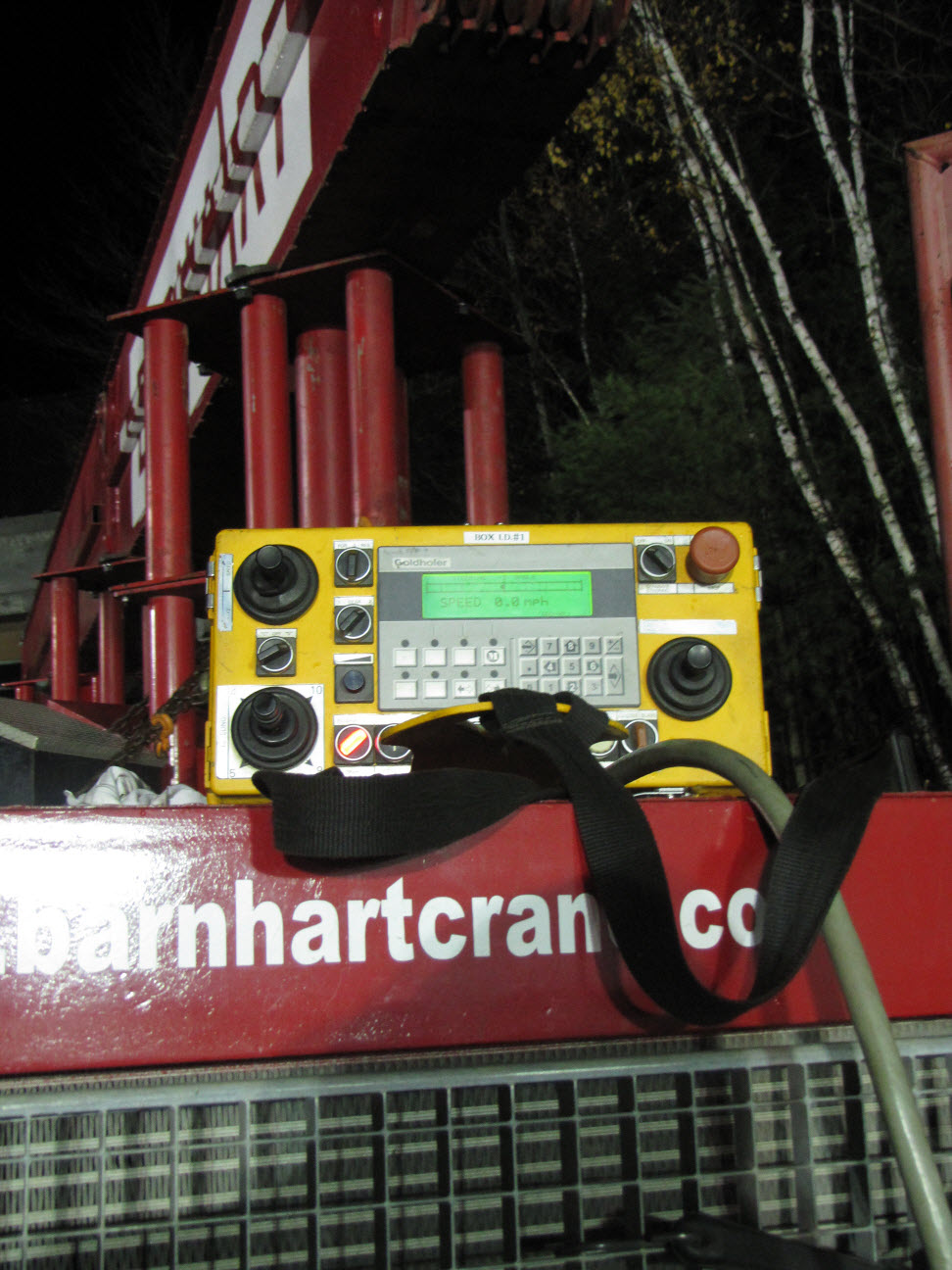
Remote controller of a Goldhofer SPMT module.

A typical SPMT has a grid of computer-controlled axles, usually 2 axles across and 4–8 axles along. When two (or more) axles are placed in series, this is called an axle line. All axles are individually controllable, in order to evenly distribute weight and to steer accurately. Each axle can swivel through 270°, with some manufacturers offering up to a full 360° of motion. The axles are coordinated by the control system to allow the SPMT to turn, move sideways or even rotate in place. Some SPMTs allow the axles to telescope independently of each other so that the load can be kept flat and evenly distributed while moving over uneven terrain. Each axle can also contain a hydrostatic drive unit.

A hydraulic power pack can be attached to the SPMT to provide power for steering, suspension and drive functions. This power pack is driven by an internal combustion engine. A single power pack can drive a string of SPMTs. As SPMTs often carry the world's heaviest loads on wheeled vehicles, they are very slow, often moving at under one mile per hour (1.6 km/h) while fully loaded. Some SPMTs are controlled by a worker with a hand-held control panel, while others have a driver cabin. Multiple SPMTs can be linked (lengthwise and side-by-side) to transport massive building-sized objects. The linked SPMTs can be controlled from a single control panel.

== History ==
In 1935 Gothaer Wagonfabrik, a Berlin based rail and aircraft manufacturer, made a motorized model of the Culemeyer Heavy Road Trailer for Deutsche Reichsbahn the German government rail transport company. The model featured a two-part equipment setup; the front part had an operating cabin with an inline four Krupp petrol engine with output of 60 hp, extendable chassis, four steerable axles, eight solid wheels in total and 32 ton load capacity. The hydraulic suspensions were the only exception that differed from modern SPMTs.

The first modern modular self-propelled trailers were built in the 1970s. In the early 1980s, the heavy haulage company Mammoet refined the concept into the form seen today. They set the width of the modules at 2.44 m, so the modules would fit on an ISO container flatrack. They also added 360° steering. They commissioned Scheuerle to develop and build the first units. Deliveries started in 1983. The two companies defined the standard units: a 4-axle SPMT, a 6-axle SPMT and a hydraulic power pack. Over the years, new types of modules were added to this system to accommodate a range of payloads.

In 2016 ESTA (the European Association of Abnormal Load Transport and Mobile Cranes) published the first SPMT best practice guide to help address the problem of trailers occasionally tipping over, which happened even when the operating rules and stability calculations had been precisely followed.

Some shipbuilding companies have started to use SPMT instead of gantry cranes for carrying ship sections. This has reduced the cost of transporting huge loads by millions of dollars.

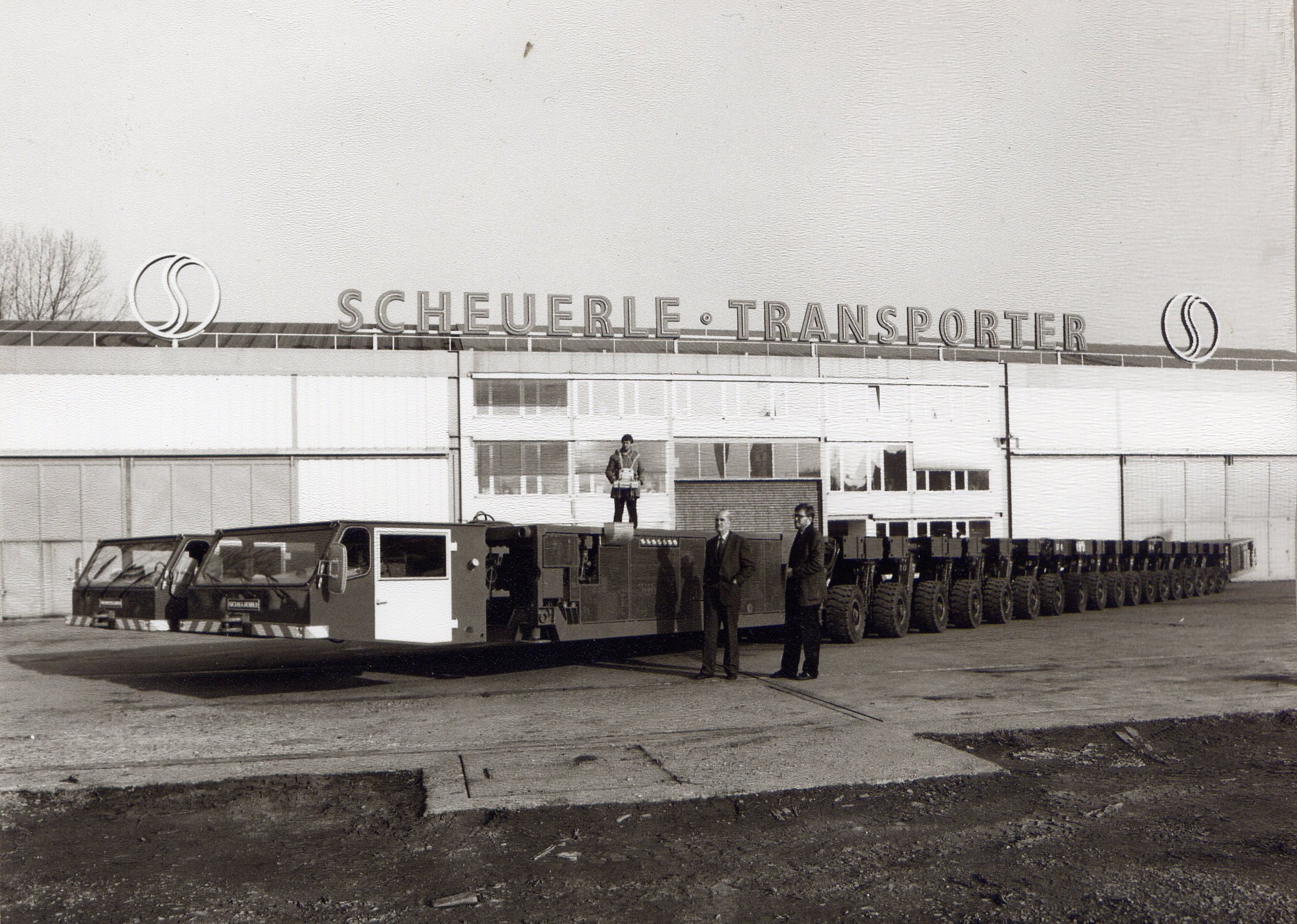
Scheuerle Fahrzeugfabrik Gen 1 14 axle line SPMT developed for Mammoet in the 1980s

In 2022, Mammoet and Scheuerle developed and employed the world's first electric SPMT. This was done with the help of an electric power pack unit (EPPU) that replaced the gas-powered PPU. The ESPMTs help to reduce the carbon footprint of the companies and also the haulage industry. These electric modules are safer and quieter when compared with the diesel modules, which can benefit operations in mines and energy plants.

ESTA has plans to develop a European Trailer Operator's License (ETOL) for SPMT operators; this idea is backed by top companies operating in the heavy haulage sector like Goldhofer and Tii Group. There will be training and practice to obtain this specific license that SPMT operators have to complete before handling these heavy machines on public roads, but this will improve the safety standards of the industry.

== Achievements ==
Executing the salvage operation of the sunken ferry MV Sewol in the East China Sea in 2017, the company ALE used SPMTs equivalent to a 600-axle line and a load weight of 17,000 t (18,739 short tons; 16,732 long tons), exceeding two world records.

In December 2022 Shell plc, a London based oil company, ordered the decommissioning of their 20,300ton FPSO Curlew ship when it reached the end of its operational life. This operation was assigned to AF Offshore Decom, a decommissioning specialist company based in Oslo that partnered with Mammoet of Utrecht to load-in and set down the structure in Norway with the help of a 748 SPMT axle line. This claimed to break two world records, one for the heaviest SPMT movement and another for the most SPMT axle lines used for transportation.

In February 2023 Sinotrans Heavy-Lift, a China-based heavy transport company, moved a hotel building 500 meters in Sanya, Hainan using 254 axle lines of Scheuerle SPMT with the help of 15 power packs. This was claimed to be the world's heaviest building transport ever. The building in the subject was almost 300 ft long, 115 ft wide, 65 ft high and weighed 7,500 tons. The relocation was done to comply with the environmental regulations of the state.

In December 2023 China Shipping Vastwin Project Logistic, a China-based logistics company and subsidiary of China-based multinational company COSCO Shipping, moved five buildings at the Ningxia Saishang Jiangnan Museum located in Ningxia, Northern China. The relocation was done to comply with environmental regulations. The buildings were 11,450 tonnes in total, with the main building weighing 10,000 tonnes, 43 mtr high, 36.9 mtr long and 31.5 mtr wide that was moved on 300 lines of SPMT and ten powerpacks. This resulted in breaking three records of height, heaviest building, and transport over the longest distance.

== Notable manufacturers ==
- Enerpac
- Faymonville
- Goldhofer
- Italcarrelli
- Mammoet
- Greiner Heavy Engineering
- Tracta
- Transporter Industry International
  - Nicolas
- Seyiton
- China
  - Suzhou Dafang Special Vehicle (SZDF)
  - Wuhan Wanshan Special Vehicle (Wanshan)
  - China Heavy Lift
  - Supro Heavy Transporter
  - New Dafang (Zhengzhou)

== Operators ==
- Denzai(www.denzai-j.com)
- ALE
- Mammoet
- Alstom
- Sarens
- Lampson International
- CLP Group
- Omega Morgan
- Nordic Crane (Sweden, Norway & Denmark)
- Allelys
- Global Rigging and Transport (USA & Canada)

== See also ==
- Heavy hauler
- Applied mechanics
- Hydraulic modular trailer
- Ballast tractor
