= Frits Fentener van Vlissingen (1882) =

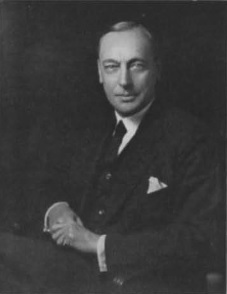
F.H. Fentener van Vlissingen

Frederik Hendrik, or Frits Fentener van Vlissingen (Amsterdam, 20 July 1882 – Vught, 30 July 1962) was a Dutch businessman and entrepreneur credited with growing SHV into the first Dutch multinational corporation. He is the grandfather of Frits Fentener van Vlissingen, John Fentener van Vlissingen and Paul Fentener van Vlissingen.

== Biography ==
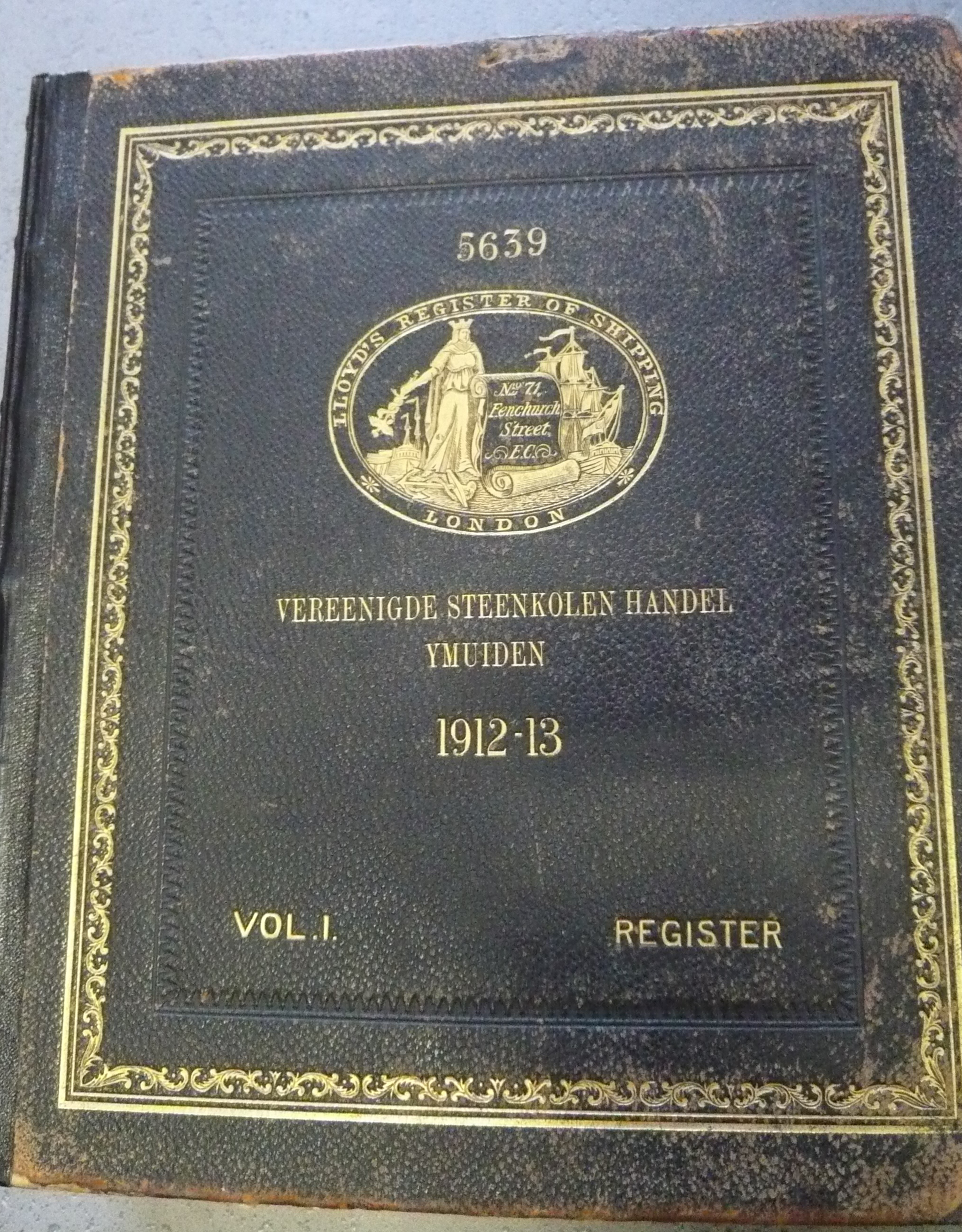
One of a series of old Lloyd's registers from former N.V. Vereenigde Steenkolenhandel offices in IJmuiden. Currently in the library of the Zee- en Haven Museum there. The SHV managed the transport of coal ("Steenkool") in the North Sea Canal.

He was married to Sophie Schout Velthuys (1882–1976), who came from a wealthy banking family (Bank Vlaer & Kol). Her twin sister Mies (1882–1925) married Fentener van Vlissingen's SHV colleague and later rival Daniel George van Beuningen. In 1904 — at age 22 — Frits began working for his father in the family company, Steenkolen Handels Vereeniging (SHV). At that time the company was the sole agent for the coal from Rheinisch-Westfälisches Kohlen-Syndikat. In 1906 he managed to win exclusive rights to the waterways of the Netherlands for the transport of coal, creating two daughter companies for this; N.V. Steenkolen Handels Vereeniging in Rotterdam, and N.V. Vereenigde Steenkolenhandel in IJmuiden. Under his leadership, the ties with Germany remained close for the company through two world wars.

Frits moved the company headquarters from Rotterdam to Utrecht, across from the Maatschappij tot Exploitatie van Staatsspoorwegen, his largest customer. During World War I he negotiated on behalf of the Ministry of Economic affairs in the Netherlands for trade in coal and iron with Germany. On 7 October 1919, the Koninklijke Luchtvaart Maatschappij voor Nederland en Koloniën (Royal Flying Company for the Netherland and her Colonies) — which would become simply KLM — was founded. Fentener van Vlissingen collected money from eight others and with his own capital he financed the company with 1.2 million guilders to allow it to start up. From that point onwards he became a board member in many large Dutch companies. Though known as an art lover and music fan who donated countless amounts to various cultural establishments, most of his efforts were for his business. He became interested in the manufacture of rayon when he discovered that it needed large amounts of coal to produce. He made a deal with the German producer Vereinigte Glanzstoff Fabriken that later led to the founding in 1929 of the Algemene Kunstzijde Unie (AKU), which was merged in 1969 to found AKZO, the predecessor to AkzoNobel. In 1938 he was a member of the board for over 40 organizations, including Hoogovens.

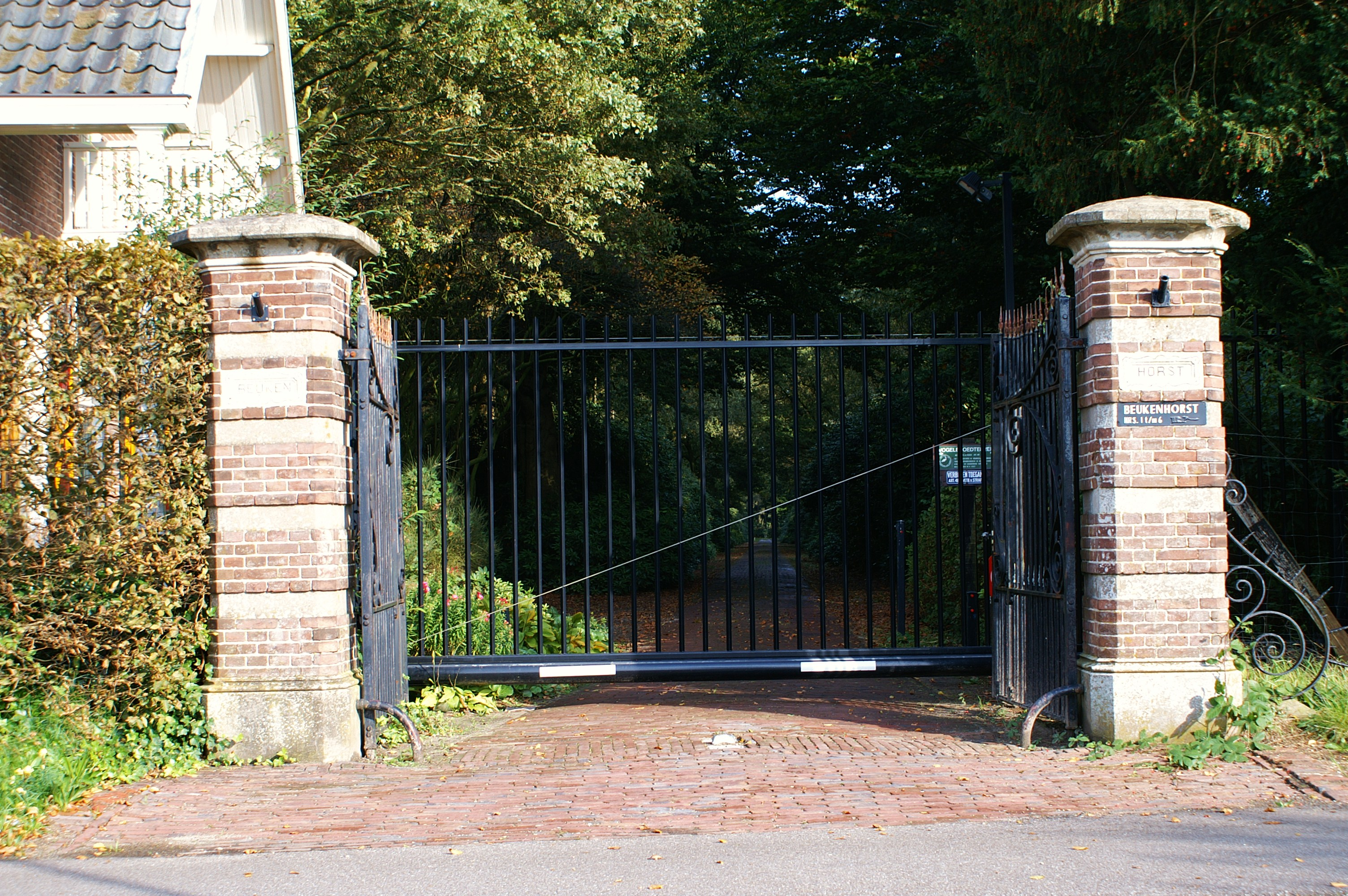
Gate of the Beukenhorst estate where Frits Fentener van Vlissingen lived with his wife for the last 11 years of his life, now a rijksmonument.

He expanded the interests of the SHV (Coal, Oil, Gas and Scrap Metal) into the making of paints and coatings.

In 1945 he gave up his director's position at SHV in favour of his son Jan, and in 1951 he moved with his wife to the estate "Beukenhorst" in Vught. His former home in Utrecht was given to the city and it became part of the Centraal Museum.
