= Tentamus Group =

Biotechnology company

Tentamus Group Ltd
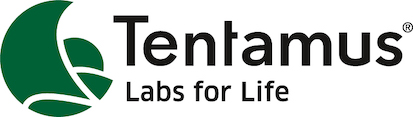
- Industry: Biotechnology
- Founded: 2011
- Headquarters: Berlin, Germany
- Key people: Dr. Christian Rebhan (CEO)
- Number of employees: 3,500
- Website: www.tentamus.de, www.tentamus.com

Tentamus Group Ltd is an international group of laboratories headquartered in Berlin and Munich. The focus of the laboratories lies in the TIC industry, where tests, consultations, and help in labelling is offered to the food & feed, pharmaceutical, cosmetic, nutraceutical & supplement, agriculture & environmental, and medical device industries.

== About the Group ==
As of 2023, there are over 90 laboratories and companies in the Tentamus Group providing analytical and consulting services. Tests that are performed on samples include:

- Instrumental Analytics
- Physical Chemistry
- Mechanical and simulation
- Microbiology
- Molecular biology
- Sensory testing

The above mentioned analysis methods makes the Tentamus Group a part of the food supply chain, providing services ranging from testing a product’s makeup and contents, as well as identifying potential safety hazards such as allergens or pathogens.

== History ==
The Tentamus Group started when bilacon GmbH became the first member in 2011. The first international expansions occurred in Spain and the USA in 2014. In 2015, Tentamus Shanghai was founded, thus marking the first steps in the Asian market. As of June 2023, there are over 90 locations within the Tentamus Group. These are as follows:

Laboratory	Joined in	Location	Sector
bilacon	2011	Berlin, Germany	Food & Feed
Quality Services International	2012	Bremen, Germany	Food & Feed
Lifeprint	2013	Illertissen, Germany	Food & Feed
Laboratorio Analítico Bioclínico (LAB)	2014	Spain	Food & Feed
Columbia Food Laboratories	2014	Portland, Oregon, United States	Food & Feed
BAV Institut für Hygiene und Qualitätssicherung	2014	Offenburg, Germany	Food & Feed, Cosmetics
Analytical Resource Laboratory (prev. ICL)	2015	United States	Nutraceuticals & Supplements
Quality Turnaround Service	2015	Sittingbourne, United Kingdom	Food & Feed
Tentamus Shanghai	2015	Shanghai, China	Food & Feed, Pharmaceuticals
Agriparadigma	2015	Italy	Food & Feed
Control Microbiologico S.L.	2015	Spain	Food & Feed
Analyst Research Laboratories	2015	Ness Ziona, Israel	Pharmaceuticals
Food and Drug Analytical Services	2016	United Kingdom	Pharmaceuticals
Helvic	2016	Stoke-on-Trent, United Kingdom	Pharmaceuticals
Tentamus North America	2016	Fredericksburg, Virginia, United States	Food & Feed
BLS-Analytik	2016	Bad Kissingen, Germany	Pharmaceuticals
Vela Labs	2016	Wien, Austria	Pharmaceuticals
aromaLAB	2016	Planegg, Germany	Food & Feed
Kudam	2016	Alicante, Spain	Food & Feed
Biomedical Device Consultants and Laboratories	2016	Germany	Medical Devices
Symbiotic Research	2017	Mount Olive, New Jersey, United States	Agrosciences
Minerva Scientific	2017	Spondon, United Kingdom	Food & Feed, Pharmaceuticals
bilacon Rotterdam	2017	Rotterdam, Netherlands	Food & Feed
Tello	2017	Spain	Food & Feed
TÜV Rheinland Food China	2017	China	Food & Feed
TÜV Rheinland Food Taiwan	2017	Taiwan	Food & Feed
Tentacontrol (prev. Luxcontrol)	2017	Hamburg, Germany	Inspection & Certification
Eurocontrol	2017	Germany	Inspection & Certification
Quant QS	2017	Martinsried, Germany	Consulting
Adamson Analytical Laboratories	2018	Corona, California, United States	Food & Feed
almolab	2018	Italy	Food & Feed
Tentamedix (prev. Micromol)	2018	Karlsruhe, Germany	Pharma & Medical Devices
EPL Bio Analytical Services	2018	Niantic, Illinois, United States	Agroscience
Analytical Food Laboratories	2018	Grand Prairie, Texas, United States	Food, Feed, Nutraceutical, and Cosmetics
RenoLab	2018	San Giorgio di Piano, Italy	Agroscience
Laemme	2018	Moncalieri, Italy	Food & Feed
Tentamus Helvetia	2018	Hochdorf, Switzerland	Food & Feed
Southern Microbiological Services	2019	Wellington, United Kingdom	Food & Feed
Tentamus Japan	2019	Yokohama, Japan	Food & Feed
Isotope	2019	Yokohama, Japan	Food & Feed
One Scientific	2019	Bristol, United Kingdom	Food & Feed
American Testing Lab	2019	San Diego, California, United States	Nutraceuticals & Supplements
Labofine	2019	Pointe-Claire, Canada	Nutraceuticals & Supplements
Nova Biologicals	2019	Conroe, Texas, United States	Food & Feed
Creamedix	2019	Germany	Pharmaceuticals & Medical Devices
DSI-Pharm (prev. Diapharm Analytics)	2019	Germany	Pharmaceuticals
Laboratorium für Betriebshygiene GmbH	2019	Austria	Pharmaceuticals
Megsan Labs	2019	India	Pharmaceuticals
bilacon Rheda-Wiedenbrück	2019	Rheda-Wiedenbrück, Germany	Food & Feed
Agrolab RDS	2019	Greece	Food & Feed, Agroscience
Envirolab	2019	Volos, Greece	Food & Feed, Agroscience
Agrolab Cyprus	2019	Nicosia, Cyprus	Food & Feed, Agroscience
Agrolab Bulgaria	2019	Sofia, Bulgaria	Food & Feed, Agroscience
Agrolab Turkey	2019	Antalya, Turkey	Food & Feed, Agroscience
TentaConsult Pharma & Med	2020	Muenster, Germany	Pharmaceutical, and Medical Devices (Consulting)
Precision Analysis	2021	Liverpool, United Kingdom	Food, Feed, and Agriculture
Techni'Sens	2021	La Rochelle, France	Food, Feed, and Cosmetics
BluTest Laboratories	2021	Glasgow, United Kingdom	Pharmaceutical
MicroBios	2021	Barcelona, Spain	Cosmetics, Pharmaceutical
EuTech Scientific Services, Inc	2021	Highland Park, New Jersey, United States	Food, Feed, Agriculture, and Pharmaceutical
Chelab	2021	Hannover, Germany	Food and Feed
Conycal	2021	Oviedo, Spain	Food, Agroscience
BAV Institut (prev. ifm Ulm)	2021	Ulm, Germany	Food, Pharmaceuticals
KML Laboratories	2021	Bonners Ferry, ID, USA	Dietary Supplement, Pharmaceutical, Cosmetics
STA Kalite	2021	Mersin, Turkey	Food and Feed
Lambda Cientifica	2021	Mexico City, Mexico	Pharma
C.A.I.M.	2021	Follonica, Italy	Food, Agriculture
Globalab	2021	Marinha Grande, Portugal	Food, Environmental
MK Analysis Laboratory	2021	Citta di Castello, Italy	Food, Agriculture, Environment
Axens & Consoreal	2022	Lille, Douai, Cergy and Valenciennes, France	Food, Feed, Cosmetics
Megsan Labs	2022	Hyderabad, India	Food
ISEMED	2022	Imola, Italy	Medical Devices, Pharmaceuticals, Cosmetics
Conidia Coniphy	2022	Quincieux, France	Agrosciences
Microlab	2022	Rehovot, Israel	Food, Cosmetics, Agriculture
Be Safer	2022	Heraklion, Crete	Tourism, Food
Pegaso Management	2023	Ancona, Italy	Food (Consulting)

== Recent operations ==
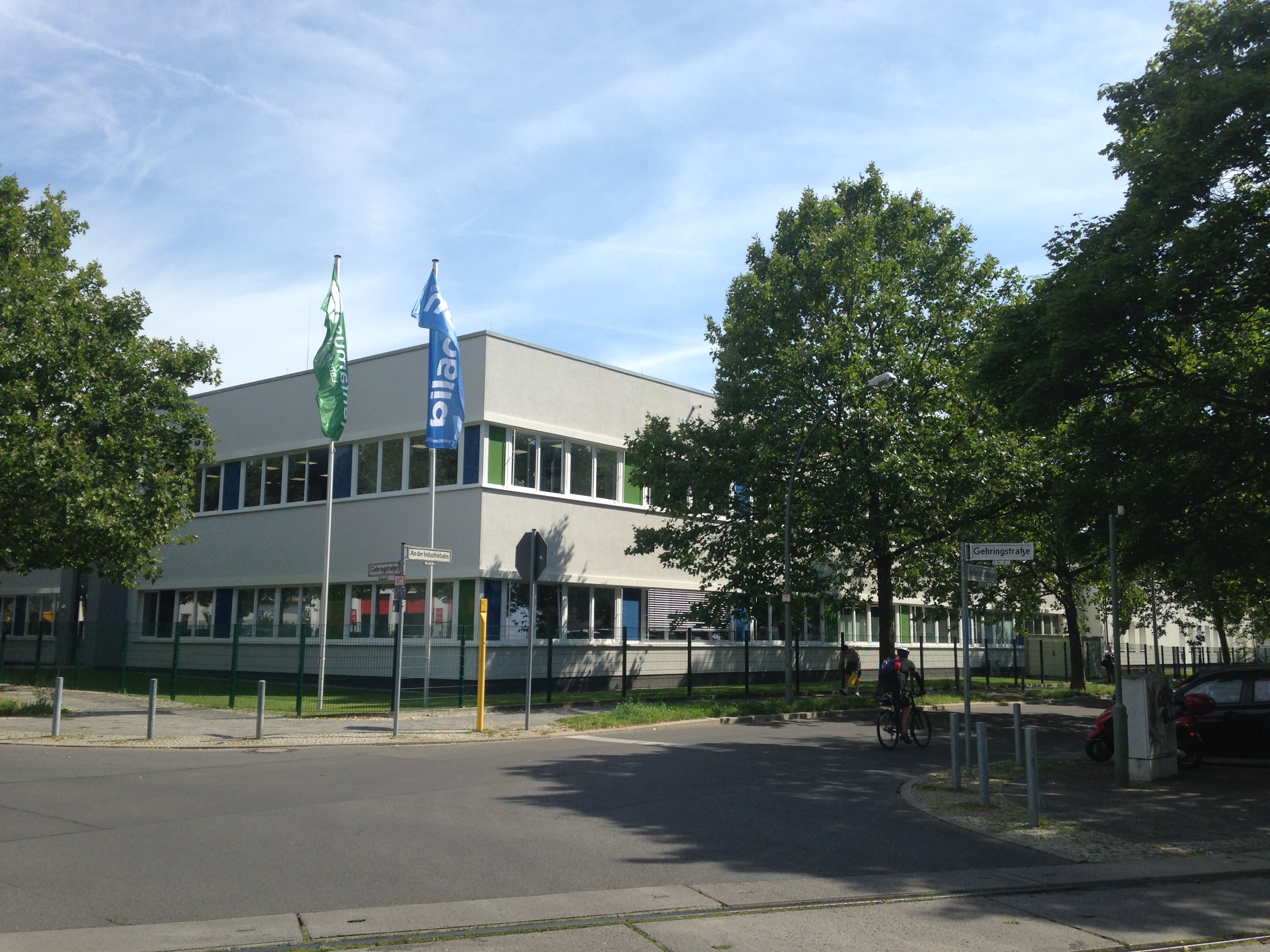
Headquarters of the Tentamus Group, in Berlin, Germany.

The acting CEOs of the Tentamus Group were Dr. Jochen Zoller and Abgar Barseyten until 2024. In 2017, Forbes included Abgar Barseyten in a list of "innovative founders to watch and learn from".

In April 2024 Dr. Christian Rebhan was appointed acting CEO while founders Jochen Zoller and Abgar Barseyten took the roles of Chairman and M&A Specialist respectively.

Tentamus laboratory QSI Bremen appeared in Netflix series Rotten, season 1 episode 1: Lawyers, Weapons, and Honey. The theme of this episode was the dilution of honey using cheap syrups. The documentary stated that QSI Bremen had been combating food fraud in honey since the 1950s. In the documentary, Gudrun Beckh stated “as long as there are profits to be made, the fraud shall continue”.
