= Ring crane =

Type of construction crane

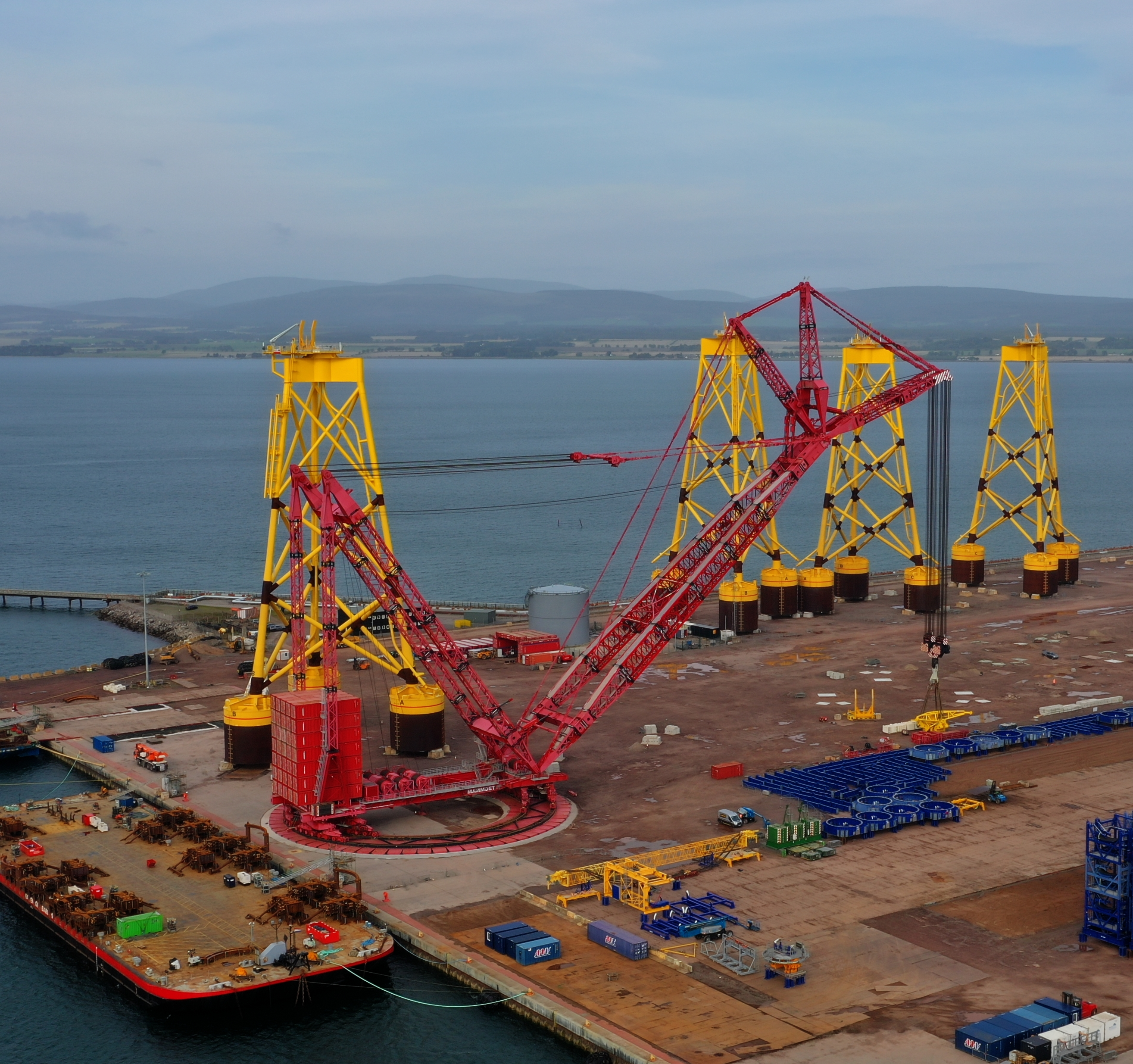
Mammoet crane (red) set up in Nigg Energy Park, Scotland to load jacket foundations (yellow) for the Seagreen Offshore Wind Farm.

A ring crane is a form of large construction crane with a luffing jib. It is distinguished by its slew pivot (Note: Slewing is the sideways rotation of the crane.) being in the form of a ring-shaped track, rather than a narrow central spindle. The broad base this gives to the slewing section above allows it to slew whilst carrying extremely heavy loads.

Ring cranes are rare. There are very few of them, and these are operated by specialised heavy lift companies. They may be shipped around the world, as needed. Mammoet operates three PTC ring cranes and two SK ring cranes. Belgian heavy-lift company Sarens has also operated such cranes since 2011.

== Operation ==
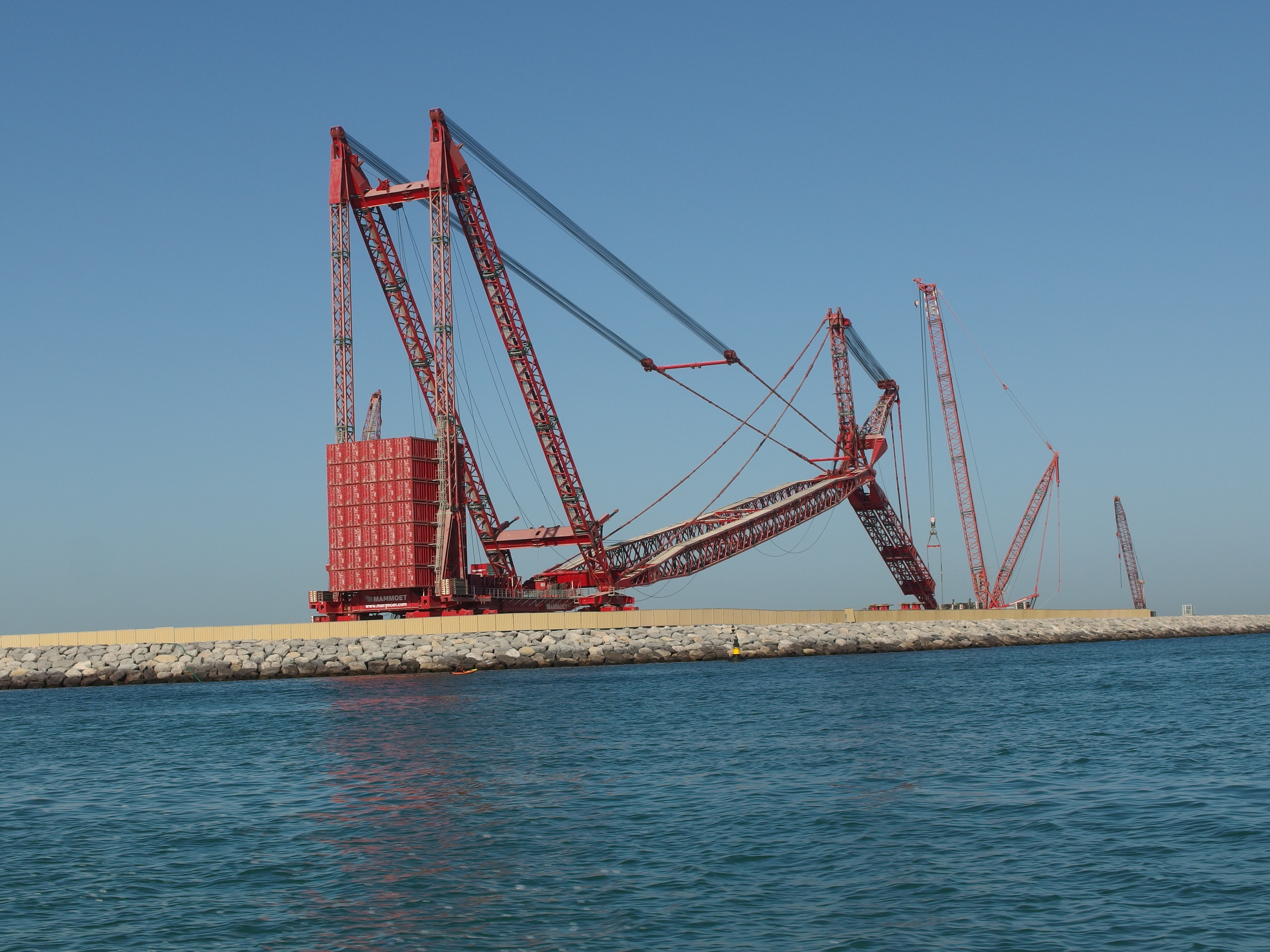
Mammoet PTC200-DS in Dubai, 2014.

Ring cranes are used either when exceptionally large single lifts are essential, or when the ability to perform such lifts would accelerate a construction project sufficiently to make the use of such a specialised crane cost-effective. Other crane types, such as gantry or Goliath cranes may have similar capacities, but the jib reach of the ring crane allows them to work over a large area. This ability for a single crane to make lifts over a large area may reduce the amount of other expensive high-capacity plant needed, such as self-propelled modular transporters (SPMT).

Typical loads include petrochemical plant modules, nuclear reactor vessels, bridge components or offshore equipment. They combine lifting capacity - up to 5,000 tons - with a long reach. Jib lengths of up to 160 metres (520 ft) give a lifting radius of up to 100 m (330 ft). They also have a small footprint compared to gantry or Goliath cranes. The performance of super-heavy jib cranes is measured in tonne-metres, the product of weight and lifting radius, typically as much as 100,000 tonne-metres for large cranes. Sarens offer a range of such cranes from 90,000 to 250,000 tonne-metres. Lifting a 3,200 ton load to a height of 120 m (390 ft) may take up to 15 minutes. (Note: A power requirement of around 5,000 kilowatts (6,700 hp).) Slewing in a complete rotation takes a similar time.

When a large load is lifted, particularly a tall vertical load, additional tailrope equipment may be needed to control the lower end swinging around. Although fixed winches may be adequate with smaller cranes, for the extremely large lifts performed by ring cranes this may need equipment such as an SPMT.

== Development ==
The first heavy ring crane was developed by Huisman in 1996, for petrochemical plant construction in Dubai. A Van Seumeren (Note: In 2000 Van Seumeren bought Mammoet and adopted their name.) Demag CC4800 crawler crane, which had been used by Huisman on other worldwide contracts since 1992, was adapted by being placed on a ring track.

== Transport ==
They can offer flexible configuration and quick mobilisation. When dismantled for shipping they may either be moved as large units or broken down further to the size of standard freight containers. On assembly, a modular design allows choices of how much reach or lifting capacity to provide. The Sarens SGC-120 can be assembled with either the main boom alone or with either a heavy-duty or light-duty jib in addition to this. The counterweight for the crane is composed of a series of open steel boxes, based on standard 40-foot (12 m) freight containers, which can be filled with low-cost, locally sourced material such as sand, rubble or scrap metal. The ring itself has a footprint diameter of 45–55 m (148–180 ft) and a ground pressure of 20 tons / m^{2}.

Assembly on site is itself a complex process, involving a number of smaller cranes and several weeks of effort, and a cost of perhaps $500,000.

== Variants ==
=== Twin boom cranes ===
Twin boom ring cranes can be supported by the wide lateral base of the ring track, giving extra lateral stability, similar to an A-frame derrick, but with the ability to slew around. As the base of this derrick is broad, comparable to the radius of the ring, this reduces the peak ground loading by spreading the load into two separate areas. Twin boom ring cranes are used for the largest ring cranes: up to 5,000 tonne load for the latest Sarens SGC-250.

ALE (merged with Mammoet) is planning to release the SK10,000 (10,000 tonne capacity) with double twin booms and twin rings in Q4 2020.

=== Ringers ===
A ringer is a similar device, although intended as an optional add-on for crawler cranes.

== Big Carl ==
The world's largest crane (Note: As of 2019.) is Big Carl, the Sarens SGC-250. The name is a reference to Carl Sarens. In September 2019, it began work at the construction site for the Hinkley Point C nuclear power station in Somerset, England, lifting the first 245-tonne reactor dome into place and in July 2025 the second. This is a double ring crane with a reach of 275 m (902 ft) and maximum lift of 5,000 tonnes.

== See also ==
- Wind turbine installation vessel
- Offshore wind port
