= Vinçotte =

- Type: Privately held
- Industry: Accredited Inspection and Certification Organisation by BELAC
- Founded: 1873; 153 years ago AIB established 1890
- Founders: Robert Vinçotte Henri Adan Maurice Urban
- Headquarters: Vilvoorde, Belgium
- Key people: Robert Vinçotte (founder)
- Products: Reliability engineering Nondestructive testing Product certification
- Revenue: € 250 million (2015)
- Number of employees: 2,500 (2015)
- Website: www.vincotte.com

Vinçotte is a Belgian accredited inspection and certification organisation, that controlled 75% of the Belgian safety, reliability market in 2004. This holding is the result of a merger between two similar non-profit inspection associations : AIB and Association Vinçotte. In May 2022, Vinçotte was acquired by Kiwa, a Dutch company active in the same industry.

== History ==
An overview of Vinçotte's history is bound to discourse on the two competing associations that merged in 1989. These two associations were : Association Vinçotte and AIB (Association des Industriels de Belgique).

=== Association Vinçotte ===
The logo of AV.

In 1872, Maurice Urban, a director of the National Railway Company of Belgium, asked Robert Vinçotte, a young engineer, to help found an organisation to inspect steam boilers in factories. The "Association pour la surveillance des chaudières à vapeur" was born. Its principal aims were twofold: the inspection of steam boilers to prevent explosions was coupled with an advocacy of a more economic use of power. Its personnel was rather limited: apart from the director, who also did inspection work, only two other engineers were employed.

The Association grew rapidly though, because of, among other reasons, the increasing legal pressure on factory owners to make their workplaces safer for their employees. Thus, in 1876, the Association was able to report that it had almost doubled its number of inspection visits in only two years. Said legal pressure resulted mainly in the July 2, 1899, and March 10, 1900, laws on safety and health. Robert Vinçotte was heavily involved in the drafting of these laws as, by then, he had a huge experience in the relatively new area of reliability engineering: not only had he led the Association for more than 25 years, but he had also made an important study visit to the United States in 1881, a trip that resulted in a series of basic mathematical rules for the reliability of steam boilers. Its success allowed the Association in 1887 to offer its employees a life insurance payable upon retirement.

Two pages from a handbook for drivers and operators of steam machines, published by the association of engineer alumni of Liège. Most of the data in the book, however, was provided by Vinçotte and his Association.

In 1905 the Association expanded its inspection domain, due to the advent of electrical devices and installations. Steam boilers would remain its main area of operation for some time to come though: in 1910 it inspected more boilers than the combined inspection organisations of Germany and France, respectively. But the First World War would put a halt to the Association's growth: not only did the latter refuse to inspect German-controlled installations, but a great number of its engineers were drafted into army service. This bleak period did not pass with the end of the war: 1919 and 1920 brought massive inflation and attendant high wage costs. This combined with the death of Robert Vinçotte Jr., son of the founder and the director of the Association at the time.

Two years later, the Association would officially become a non-profit organisation, as this concept had just entered Belgian law. The occasion was also used for a name change: the lengthy "Association pour la surveillance des chaudières à vapeur" was lengthened to "Association Vinçotte pour la surveillance des chaudières à vapeur" in honour of its first director. Only in 1936 would the implication of only inspecting steam boilers (true in the beginning, but not anymore by 1922) be elided for the short "Association Vinçotte" (henceforth: AV).

In the 1930s, the gradual loss of the focus on steam boiler inspections would continue: not only would AV inspect more and more electrical power plants, but it also sent its engineers to the nascent European airlines. In 1938, AV cooperated with its competitor, the "Association des Industriels de Belgique" (AIB, cf. below) to perform the first radiographic inspection of weldings. It was applied to the bridges under construction over the Albert Canal. After inspection, these bridges were shown to be disastrously dangerous for the weight they were supposed to bear. In the same year, AV also experimented with gamma ray inspections, utilizing radium obtained from Union Minière's mines in Katanga.

Similarly to the first one, the Second World War put a temporary stop to AV's activities. Yet business would pick up faster this time, allowing a study trip of Richard Vinçotte, another son of the first director, to the United States, in 1947. In the same year, the new "Règlement Général pour la Protection du Travail" ("General Rules for the Work Protection") allowed a broad range of activities for accredited inspection organisations such as AV and AIB.

Meanwhile, AV kept on expanding, gaining more and more international prestige. It was this prestige that allowed it to inspect one of the biggest turbo alternators in the world, which was being built in England for the United States in 1969. 1969 was also a good year because it was then that the nuclear division of AV was founded. Called AV Nucléaire, it would focus on making secure the growing number of nuclear power plants in Belgium and abroad.

Innovation would continue in the 70s, when AV started thermographic inspections and nondestructive testing using Foucault currents. Anticipating the problems of the future, it also invested in noise pollution research and set up the first mobile lab in Belgium to investigate air quality through samples. In 1973, looking backward on the occasion its 100th anniversary, AV could proudly announce that none of the steam boilers that exploded in Belgium had been under its regular inspection.

As with so many companies of the era, the 80s brought financial hardship and cutbacks. This finally led to a merger with its competitor AIB, making the new "AIB-Vinçotte" the biggest player at inspection and certification on the Belgian market. Both companies had already closely cooperated in Controlatom, and of course shared a great deal of heritage, all the way back to their roots.

=== AIB (Association des Industriels de Belgique) ===
The logo of AIB.

In 1890, 13 engineers, captains of industry, and representatives of parliament gathered to found the "Association des Industriels de Belgique pour l'étude et la propagation des engins et mesures propres à préserver les ouvriers des accidents du travail" (usually shortened to AIB). This happened under the impulse of Henri Adan, the director of the Royale Belge, a Belgian insurance company. In the speech he gave on the first meeting of the board, Adan strongly expressed his faith in private initiative instead of state interference:

The speech Henri Adan gave on the first board meeting of AIB.

Comme le disait M. Westerroiien van Mesteren, le promoteur de l'Association Néerlandaise pour prévenir les accidents dans les fabriques et chantiers, il est de la plus haute importance pour un petit pays de se joindre au mouvement international qui permet à l'initiative privée de l'industriel, de faire le bien sans qu'une loi coercitive lui prescrive ce devoir et le rende odieux. Cette appréciation trouvait particulièrement application en notre pays; il était impossible que nos traditions de liberté nous permissent d'hésiter entre un régime coercitif et les enseignements d'un régime libre.

Of course, as described in the previous section of this article, the Belgian state would introduce legislation concerning the safety of the workplace only ten years later, slightly undermining the pure laissez-faire philosophy enunciated here. Thus, later presidents of the Association such as Yvon Verwilst would rather claim (in 1940) that AIB is "le corollaire de celle de pouvoirs publics et qu'elle se considérait comme l'auxiliaire de ceux-ci" This switch in rhetoric between claiming to anticipate the state and merely serving it as a supplement, is a constant in AIB's speeches up to 1940.

The structure of the newborn Association was to be non-profit: members would pay fees and get regular inspections and safety education by engineers of AIB. From the beginning, AIB had a general focus on security and education. Thus, it did not hesitate to create new divisions. Already in 1894, president M. Jottrand declared that henceforth AIB would start inspecting chains, whose breakage was causing heavy accidents in the mining and construction business.

Fame came quickly for AIB, in Belgium and abroad: there was the admired exposition in Brussels of machine parts and how they might fail, and in Paris the Association received a gold medal for two expositions (in 1900 and 1904). In 1910, AIB exposed in Brussels, Liège, Milan and St. Louis.

After the First World War, AIB's personnel remained constant, and hirings started soaring after 1931, showing the solid expansion of the Association in that period. The surplus in money was invested in a unique machine, one that could exert a test power of 800 tons on cables and chains. At the time (1938), there was no other like it in the world.

In the 50s, AIB would focus on organising international congresses: in 1955 the First International Congress on Nondestructive Testing and in 1958 the Second International Congress for the Prevention of Work Accidents.

Finally, in 1989, it merged with its major competitor in Belgium, the Association Vinçotte, making the combined "AIB-Vinçotte" the biggest player on the Belgian market.

=== After the merger ===
In the 1990s, AIB-Vinçotte stabilized itself financially, and adopted a holding structure. In 2004, it shortened its name to just "Vinçotte" and opened offices in 14 countries. In 2017 it was decided to focus on the 3 main countries: Belgium, the Netherlands and Luxemburg. In May 2022, Vinçotte was acquired by the Kiwa Group.

== ITER Project ==
In 2008, ITER has decided to ask Vinçotte who is accredited by the French Nuclear Authorities ASN to assess the confinement vessel, heart of the project, following the French Nuclear Regulatory requirements.
