= Sarens =

Belgian heavy lift, crane rental and engineering company

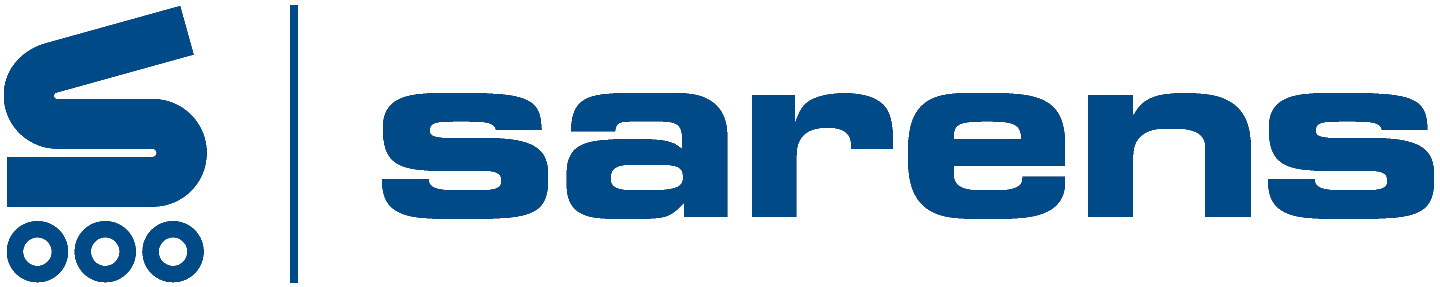
- Industry: Construction equipment
- Founded: 1921
- Founder: Frans Sarens
- Headquarters: Wolvertem, Flemish Brabant, Belgium
- Products: Crane rentals
- Revenue: +€800 million

Sarens is a Belgian multinational company headquartered in Wolvertem, Belgium. Its business includes, heavy lift, engineered transport, and crane rental services. It produces a variety of equipment including cranes, transportation, gantries, jacking products, and other heavy lifting products.

== History ==
Sarens was founded by Frans Sarens in 1921 for forestry works and the transportation of trees using horses and carts. Soon, the company entered the mechanical transportation and lifting industry. It was incorporated on the 2nd of September in 1955. The company’s equipment has been used for projects including cement plant repairs, sea port operations, bridge construction, canal expansion (including the Panama Canal), mass transit construction, sports arenas, and power plant installations as well as repairs, such as the Chernobyl Nuclear Plant. Sarens has completed lifts with cranes stationed on both land and floating on the water.

Sarens has acquired companies over the years including the UK firm G W Sparrow and Sons in 1997, the crane rental business of the Dutch firm Riwal in 2007, the American firm Rigging International in 2009, the Polish firm Zuraw Grohman in 2010, and Canada Crane Services in 2010. They also have strategic partnerships with companies including Omega Morgan.

In 2011 Waterland Private Equity Investments, an Amsterdam based investment firm invested 100 million euros into Sarens and acquired 22% stake in the heavy lift company making it a minority stakeholder.

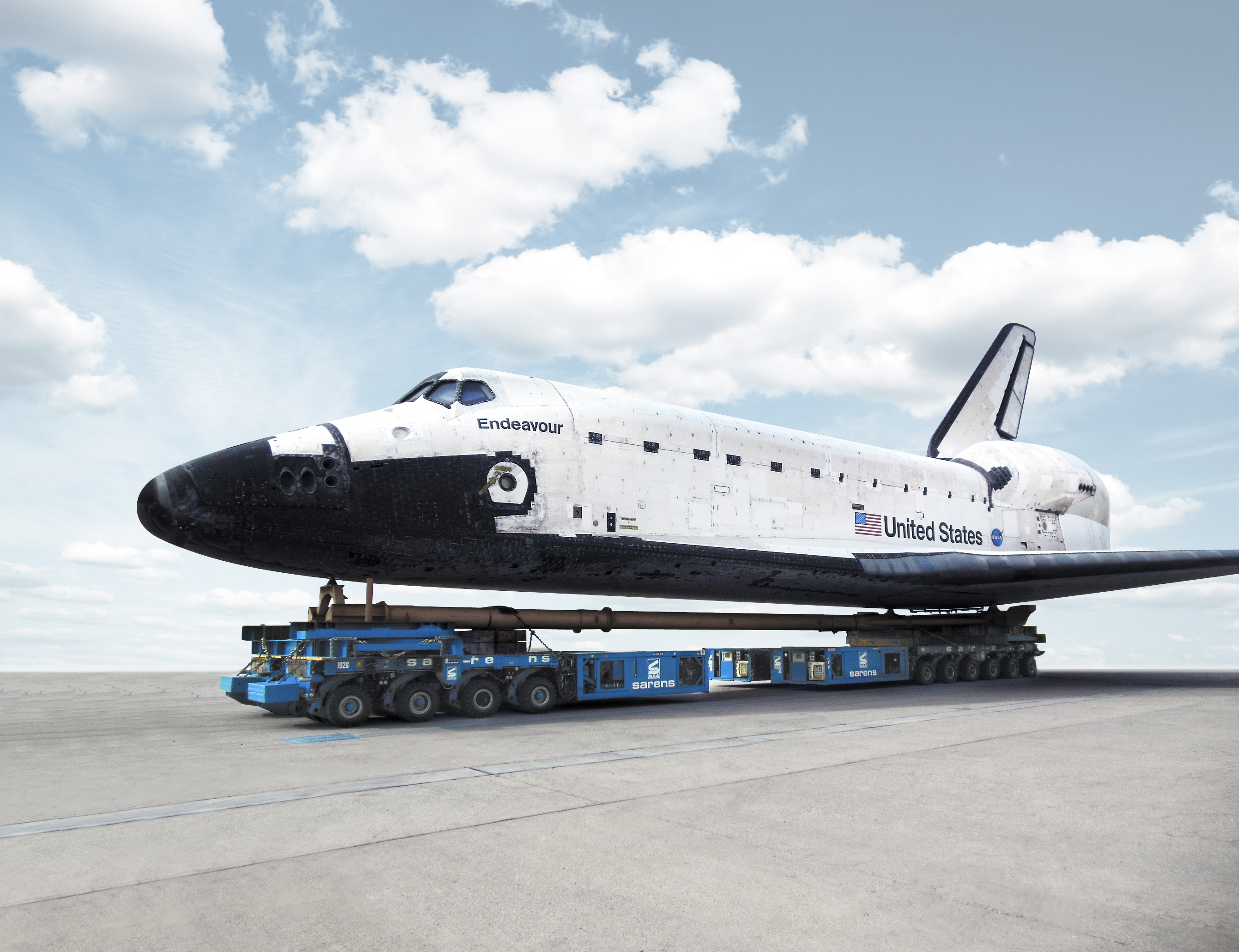
Sarens Kamag SPMT hauling NASA Endeavour Space Shuttle in 2012

In 2021 Luc Tack a Belgian entrepreneur acquired 22% stake that was previously owned by Waterland Private Equity Investments after the investment Luc Tack and Aaron Coone of Begoos Group were appointed as director of the heavy lift group.

Sarens Family regained 100% stake in Sarens in 2023 after an agreement with Luc Tack of Begoos Group. The amount of the transaction was not disclosed, but the buyback gave the founding family full control over the operations of the company, which they believe would strengthen the company.

Sarens signed a MOU with four crane service providers in India to tap the crane rental, Heavy lifting and oversize transport in the nation. This partnership would cover oil and gas, petrochemical, power plants, infrastructure and industrial construction. They aim to uplift safety, environmental and quality to global standards.

== Equipment ==
=== Cranes ===
- Ring Cranes
- Mobile Cranes
- Crawler Cranes
- Tower Cranes

Trailers

- Semi Trailer
- Hydraulic Modular Trailer
- Self Propelled modular Trailer

Lifting and Jacking

- Gantries
- Jacking System
- Standard Jacks
- Skidding

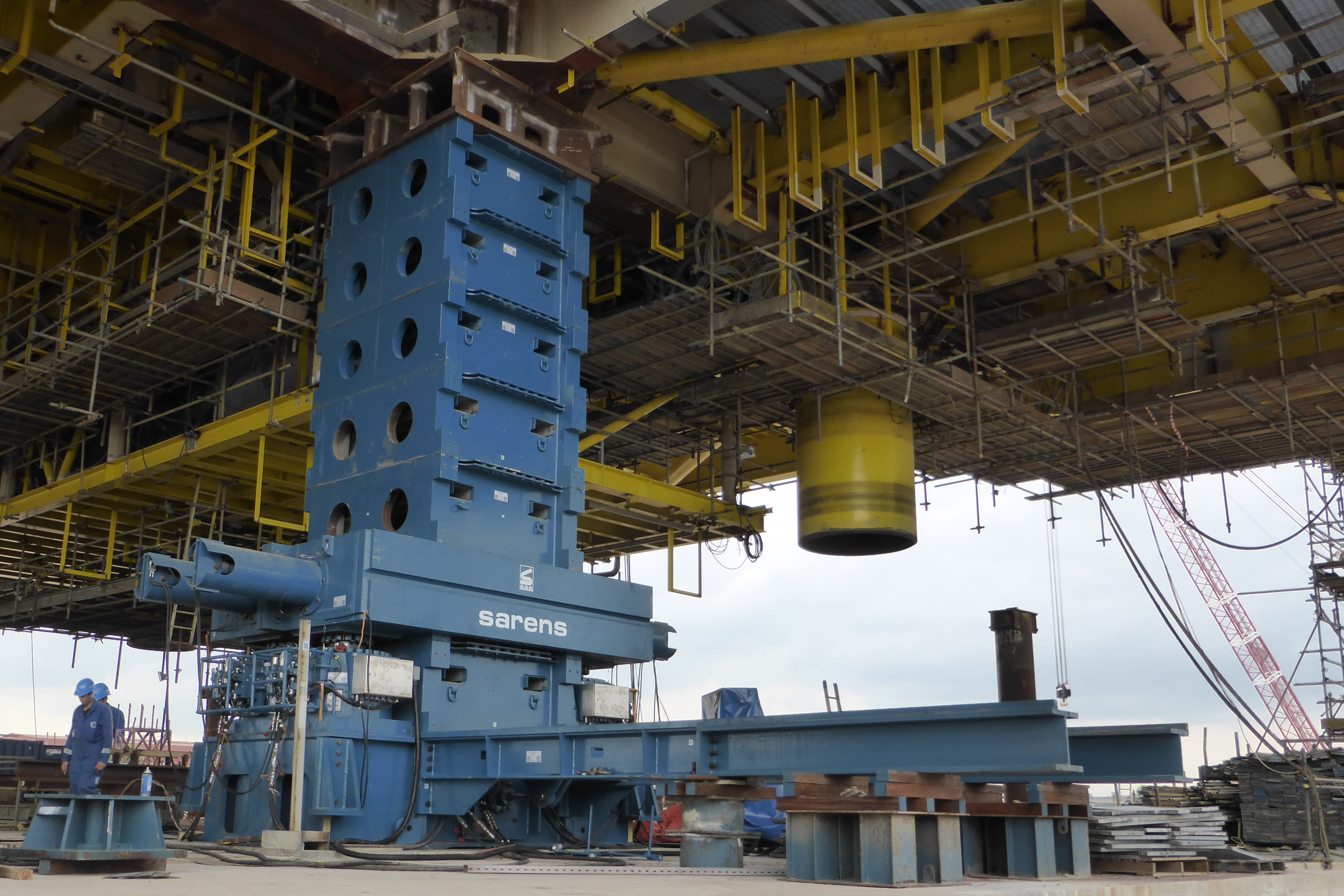
Sarens S5000 Climbing system under an oil rig

Maritime Equipment

- Barges
- Twin Barge
- Modular Barge

Material Handling

- Forklift
- Aerial Work Platform
- Reach Stacker
- Telescopic Handlers
- Sweepers
- Heavy Equipment

== Sarens Giant Cranes ==
Sarens Giant Cranes (SGC) are in-house built ring cranes by Sarens itself with European standards and super heavy lifting capacity which is not available as normal cranes in market.

Official Name	Load Moment	Capacity (t)	YOM	Counter Weight (t)	Main Boom (m)	Light-duty Jib (m)	Heavy-duty Jib (m)
SGC-90	99,000	2,325	2020	2,700	100/120/130	35.5/47.5m/59.5	-
SGC-120/1	1,40,000	3,200	2011	3,600/4,200	88.7/118/130	89.5	40.5/64.1/87.7/ 99.5
SGC-140	1,40,000	3,200	2017	4,200	88.7/118/130	89.5	40.5/64.1/87.7/ 99.5
SGC-170	1,70,000	3,200	2025	3,500/4,200	120	89.5	40.5/64.1/87.7/ 99.5
SGC-250	2,50,000	5,000	2018	5,200	118/160.5	-	40.5/64.1/87.7/ 99.5

SGC-120/1 (Big Benny)

Originally in-house manufacture, red in 2011 in collaboration with Rigging International, a California based company. The 3,200 ton lifting capacity ring crane was developed keeping all European and American standards and transportation in mind. The crane required minimal ground surface to operate and due to the small size only requiring 135 containers to transport. In 2025 SGC-120 was upgraded in 2025 as SGC-120.1 to strengthen its structure with reinforcement these upgrade helped the crane to lift was much as the SGC-140.

SGC-140 (Big Benny XL)

When launched back in 2017 the SGC-140 was the largest crane in the world. This was the second crane in the SGC lineup after the commissioning the crane started its first operation for Tengizchevroil a Chevron company in Kazakhstan which had operation in an oil field named Tengiz Field in the Caspian Sea.

SGC-250 (Big Carl)

The manufacturing of the big carl started in 2017 and took 14 months to reach the completion stage. The crane was named in honor of Carl Sarens, director of technical solutions at Sarens. After the manufacturing, the crane was sent to UK for its first contract worth 20 million euros at Hinkley Point C nuclear power station. The transportation took 280 trucks and 5 cranes to move the 5,000 ton capacity ring crane from its manufacturing site in Belgium to the nuclear power station. It held the record for world's largest crane from 2017 to 2024 until the launch of Mammoet's SK6000, which had lifting capacity of 6,000 tons.

SGC-90 (The Little Celeste)

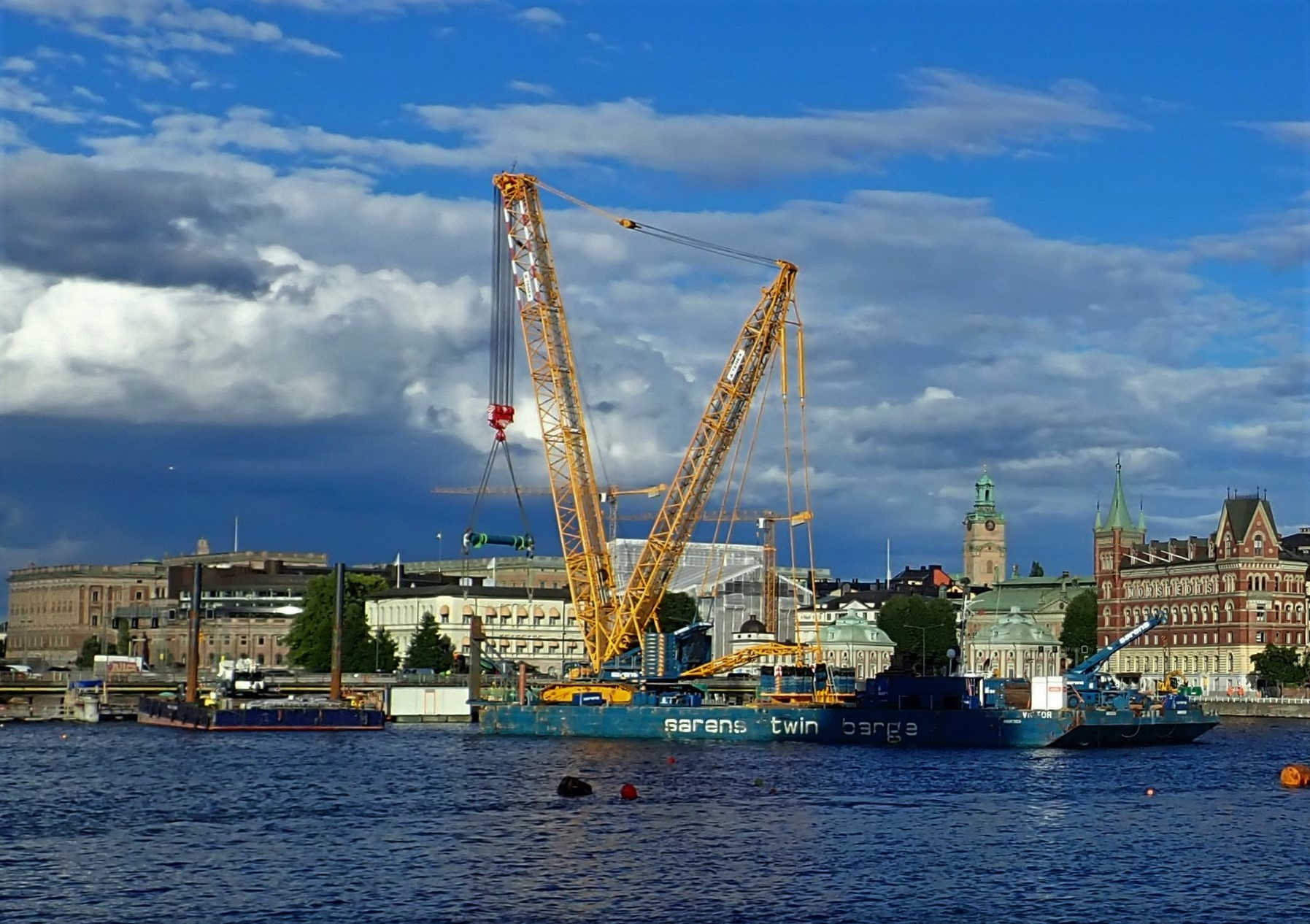
Sarens twin barge and crawler crane at Stockholm.

The little Celeste is the first fully electric powered ring crane in the SGC line up. Manufactured in 2020 development of the crane and manufacturing process includes the COVID-19 pandemic period but still completed in timeline. The crane has zero fuel consumption because it's fully electric powered and can be plugged into the grid at the working site with being fully electric, the crane itself also generates electricity when it lowers heavy loads and reuse it by cutting down the cost to 40%. The crane has lower maintenance compared to a traditional crane because of zero engine use ables.

SGC-170

After the success of SCG-90 Sarens manufacture SGC-170 in 2025 a fully electric powered ring crane bigger than the SGC-90 matching the lifting ability of the traditional SGC-120 and SGC-140 which were fuel powered. With innovations, Sarens managed to develop the crane with fewer connection and bigger components, reducing the transport process and relocation of the giant crane within a week. The crane model also has a modular drivetrain which can suite various clients of the company.

== Corporate governance ==
The CEO of the company is Wim Sarens, who represents the 4th generation of the Sarens family management. In 2024, the company had over 5500 employees.

== See also ==
- ALE
- Collett & Sons
- Mammoet
- Pickfords
- Omega Morgan
- Lampson International
