= Kiwa NV =

Dutch inspections company

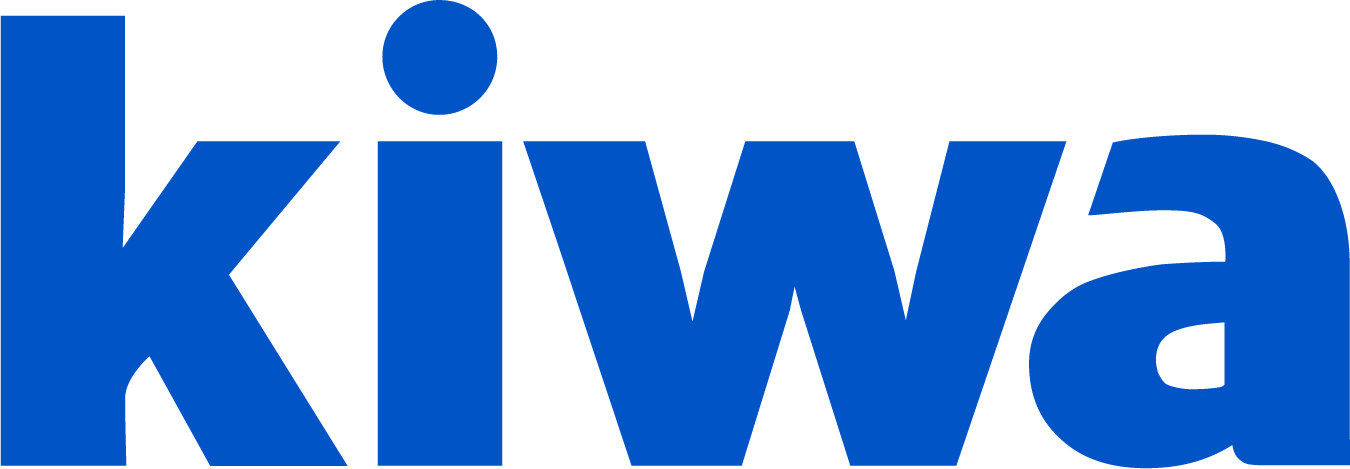
- Company type: Privately held company, LLC
- Industry: Testing, Inspection, Certification
- Founded: 1948; 78 years ago
- Headquarters: Rijswijk, The Netherlands
- Area served: Worldwide (35+ countries)
- Key people: Luc Leroy (CEO)
- Revenue: €1.3 bn (2023)
- Owner: SHV Holdings
- Number of employees: 10,954 (2023)
- Website: www.kiwa.com

Kiwa is a Dutch company in the testing, inspection and certification (TIC) sector, providing testing, inspection, certification, consultancy and training services across various markets, including built environment, (cyber) security, renewable energy, food, feed & farm, water and health care.

Based in Rijswijk, the Netherlands, its over 10,000 employees operate across a global network of office and advanced testing laboratory locations in 35 countries.

== History ==
A group of Dutch drinking water companies founded Kiwa NV in 1948 as KIWA, an acronym for Keuringsinstituut voor Waterleiding Artikelen (Institution for the Examination of Waterworks Items), with the initial aim of monitoring the quality of drinking water throughout the Netherlands. As new regulations demanded that articles used in water processing and management, such as water pipes, fittings and valves, had to adhere to certain standards, Kiwa took on the responsibility of testing the compliance of these articles to set standards. Products meeting the requirements are still marked with the Kiwa label today.

Kiwa’s stringent testing methodologies contributed to the company expanding its activity to the construction and environmental sectors. To align with its broader operational scope, the company’s name was changed from KIWA to Kiwa N.V. While the company continued to experience rapid growth in the Netherlands, Kiwa initiated an international expansion program in 1998. During the first five-year period, branches were established in Belgium, Germany, Italy, Scandinavia, Spain, Turkey, the United Kingdom and China.

On top of this organic expansion, strategic acquisitions became an important driver in Kiwa’s growth. Since 2000, Kiwa has acquired many companies, including Gastec (the Netherlands, the UK and China), Inspecta (Norway, Sweden, Finland, Poland and the Baltic states) and Vinçotte (Belgium and Luxembourg). Since 2021, Kiwa has been a member of SHV, one of the world’s largest private trading groups.

In 2021, it was acquired by SHV Holdings.

== Operations ==
Kiwa operates across a wide range of markets, including sustainability, fire safety and security, medical devices, construction and infrastructure, automotive, food, feed and farm, (renewable) energy (such as solar, wind and hydrogen) and management systems. At the core of its operations lies the testing, inspecting and certification of products, services and systems. Complementary to these services, Kiwa provides training, technological consultancy, data processing and benchmarking, digital solutions and calibration services.

To maintain its position as an independent partner, Kiwa strictly separates its certification services from other activities, like training courses and technological consultancy. The organization is evaluated by multiple accreditation bodies, audited by external organizations, and qualified by governmental bodies. Kiwa is also recognized as an Approval Body, Accepted Laboratory and Accredited Training Institution.

Certificate issuance is one of the company’s key activities, and Kiwa provides a trademarked label for visual identification once certification is granted. Kiwa provides both in-house and licensed certification labels, including in domains such as management systems (e.g., ISO 9001), cybersecurity (e.g., ISO 27001), food safety (e.g., FSSC 22000) and environmental, social and governance (ESG) (e.g., ISO 14001).

Airline flight crew licence As one of the few countries in the world the Netherlands has privatised the issuance of flight crew licences for personnel in the civil aviation industry. As a result the pilot, stewardess and technician licences are issues on behalf of the government by KIWA.

For its testing services, Kiwa maintains a global network of laboratories dedicated to product testing, measurement and calibration. Inspection has become increasingly important for the company, constituting a growing portion of its core operations. Kiwa conducts inspections both on-site and remotely, covering areas such as tank storage, pipes and cables, and hazardous materials.

== Governance ==
Executive Board:

- Luc Leroy, Chief Executive Officer (CEO)
- Koen Beeckmans, Chief Financial Officer (CFO)
- Matt Courtney, Chief Operating Officer (COO)
- Nicolas Kydnt, Chief Operating Officer (COO)
- Marrianne Groeneveld, Chief Human Resources Officer (CHRO)
- Bastiaan Moolenaar, Chief Transformation Officer (CTO)

== Business structure ==
Kiwa operates with a decentralized structure, dividing its operations into regions encompassing multiple countries. Each Kiwa country offers a portfolio of TIC-related services customized to address the needs of local markets and customers. The company also services key markets, offering a market-specific portfolio of TIC-related products at an international level.

== Corporate ESG ==
Kiwa has a demonstrated commitment to sustainability and has incorporated environmental, social and governance (ESG) principles into its operations. More than two-thirds of the company’s services relate to ESG development, reflecting its focus on this topic. In 2015, Kiwa became the first certification body in the Netherlands to receive the CSR management certificate following compliance with CSR Performance Ladder requirements. In anticipation of future compliance with the Corporate Sustainability Reporting Directive (CSRD), Kiwa publishes an annual CSR Report that provides a comprehensive overview of the company’s ESG performance. Kiwa’s CSR Route strategy outlines the company’s ESG-related goals and the steps it will take to achieve them. This includes incorporating CSRD requirements, further reducing the company’s carbon footprint, and addressing Kiwa’s most significant sustainability impacts.
