= Skretting =

Skretting is the world's largest producer of feeds for farmed fish.

== Company ==
In 2016, the company has operations on five continents and produces 2 million tonnes of feed annually, for more than sixty species of fish. Skretting is a wholly owned subsidiary of the Nutreco feed group in the Netherlands.

Skretting has around 2,900 employees world-wide and production takes place at seventeen production plants around the world. These plants produce feed products sold worldwide. Skretting's head office is located in Stavanger, Norway, where both the Norwegian and international management are also located. Skretting's international research company, Skretting Aquaculture Research Centre, is also located in Stavanger.

== History ==
In 2003 all fish feed companies in Nutreco united under the global brand Skretting. Many Skretting companies have a long history in their local markets, sometimes going back 30–40 years in the history of fish feed.

=== Timeline ===
1899: Skretting in Norway is established as a company dealing with agricultural goods.
1931: Trouw Nutrition (Netherlands) is established and later becomes an early R&D centre for fish nutrition.
1953: Trouw France is established.
1963: Trouw Italy (later Hendrix SpA) is established. First ten tonnes of fish feed produced in Norway by Skretting.
1969: Moore-Clark established to serve markets in USA and Canada. Trouw in UK manufactures first fish feed for the fledgeling industry.
1970: Trouvit established as a European fish feed brand. Trouw in UK markets first extruded trout feeds.
1973: Skretting established their first research farm for sea farming of Atlantic salmon.
1975: BP Nutrition formed, which in time the Trouw companies, Skretting and Moore-Clark become a part of.
1980: First fish feed for sea bass and sea bream produced in Italy.
1982: First fish feed produced in Australia (by Gibson Ltd.).
1983: First extruded salmon feed introduced in the market in Norway.
1985: Trouw España is established.
1988: Trouw Chile established as joint venture between Trouw Int. and Suralim.
1989: Trouw Ireland is established. The Aquaculture Research Centre (ARC) is established.
1994: Aquaculture and agriculture activities divested by BP and become part of newly established Nutreco.
1995: Trouw Ireland approved to produce organic fish feed. First 10 tonnes of organic salmon feed produced.
1997: Yamaha Motor Company and Nutreco founded a 50:50 company, Yamaha Nutreco Aquatech (YNA), to sell fish feed in Japan.
2000: Trouw Yem established for sales in Turkey.
2001: Production of cold extrusion starter feeds for salmon, trout, eel and marine species in a dedicated factory in France. Acquisition of fish feed plant in Australia.
2003: Nutreco's fish feed activities are united in one name, Skretting. Skretting in Norway launches electronically tracking and tracing system.
2005: Yamaha Nutreco Aquatech changes its company name to Skretting and also acquire 100% of the shares of Kirin Feed, a subsidiary of Kirin Beer Co. in Japan.
2007: Skretting pass 1 million tonnes of produced and delivered salmon feed in just over 11 months.
2008: Skretting acquire Nelson and Sons, Inc., the manufacturer of Silver Cup fish feed, in the USA. Skretting in Japan acquires the fish feed production facilities of Marine Net Co. Ltd.
2009: Nutreco acquires 51% shareholding in Brazilian animal nutrition and fish feed company. A new joint venture named "Fri-Ribe" formed.
2010: Acquisition of Tomboy Aquafeed JSC in Vietnam.
2012: Conversion of Nelson & Sons, Inc. to Skretting USA and launch of new product lines in the USA.

== See also ==
- Commercial fish feed
- Skretting Aquaculture Research Centre
