= Caledonian Stadium =

Football stadium in Inverness, Scotland

Sarens PSG Stadium
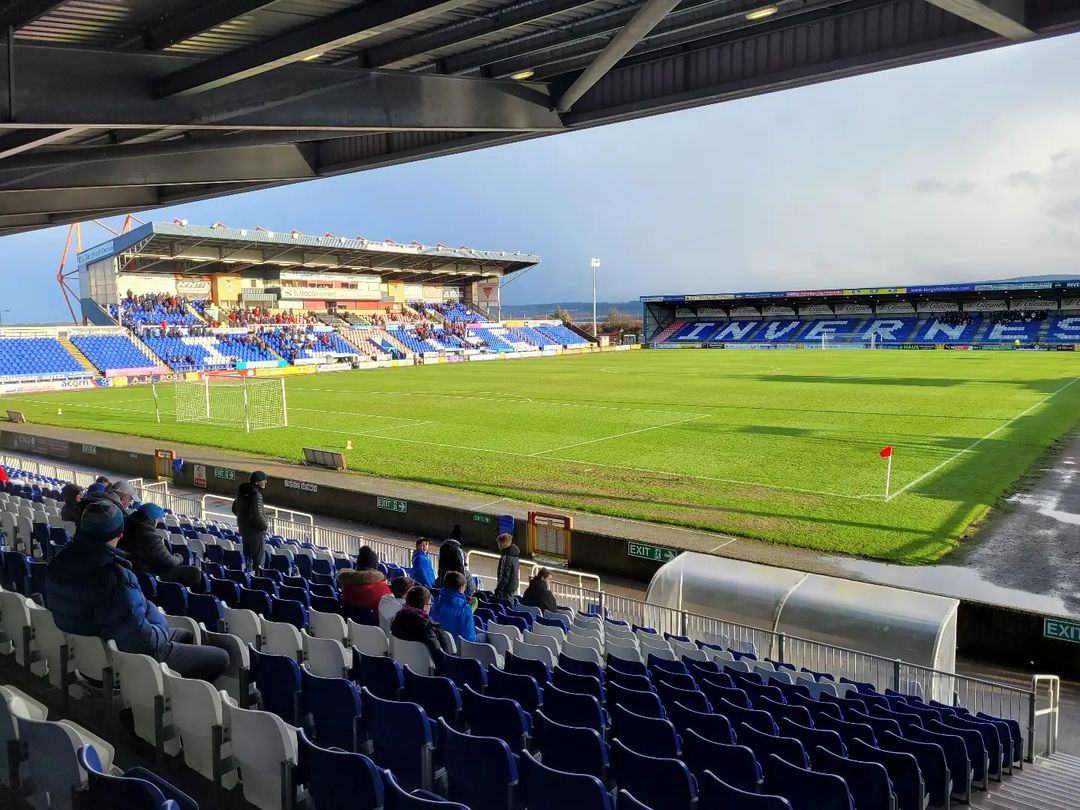

- Location in the Inverness area
- Former names: Tulloch Caledonian Stadium (2005–2019); Caledonian Stadium (1996–2005; 2019–2025)
- Location: Inverness, Scotland
- Coordinates: 57°29′41″N 4°13′03″W
- Owner: Highland Council
- Capacity: 7,512
- Surface: Grass
- Record attendance: 7,753 (Football) 10,000+ (Concert)

Construction
- Built: 1996
- Opened: 9 November 1996
- Expanded: 2004

Tenant
- Inverness Caledonian Thistle (1996–present)

Caledonian Stadium, currently known as the Sarens PSG Stadium for sponsorship reasons, is a football stadium in the Longman area of Inverness, Scotland, near the banks of the Moray Firth. It is the home ground of Scottish Championship club Inverness Caledonian Thistle.

== History ==
Inverness Caledonian Thistle was formed in 1994 by the merging of two Highland League clubs, Caledonian and Inverness Thistle. Between 1994 and 1996, the new club played their home matches at Telford Street Park, which had been the home ground of Caledonian. However, one of the pledges made to gain entrance into the Scottish Football League (SFL) was that they would move to a newly built ground by August 1995. Four sites were considered until early in 1995, when Highland Council gave approval to a site called East Longman, next to the A9 road and the Kessock Bridge. This site had to overcome concerns of the local Harbour Trust that the stadium floodlights would interfere with traffic in the Moray Firth and the need for an access road to relieve traffic from the A9. Inverness District Council approved the plans and authorised £900,000 of public funds to cover a funding gap.

The SFL extended the deadline for a new stadium to 1996, but the District Council was provided legal advice that the public funds could only be provided under set conditions, which caused further delay. The club threatened to resign from the SFL if the funds were not forthcoming, but eventually the District Council granted the funds in December 1995. The new stadium opened in November 1996 and hosted its first SFL match, a 1–1 draw between Caley Thistle and Albion Rovers. The stadium held 5,000 supporters at opening and cost £5.2 million. This was funded by selling the old grounds of Caledonian and Inverness Thistle for £1.1 million, the grant from Inverness District Council, £500,000 from the Football Trust and the rest was provided by the Inverness and Nairn Enterprise Board, sponsors and supporters. The local authority retained ownership of the ground, with Inverness Caledonian Thistle being given a 99-year lease on the site.

In March 1997, the Caledonian Stadium hosted its first international game, a 5–1 victory of Scotland U-16 over England U-16. In 1998 the stadium hosted Group D of the 1998 UEFA European Under-16 Championship, specifically Russia, Ukraine and Croatia. With Israel being hosted in neighbouring Dingwall. The Caledonian Stadium also hosted a 4–1 win of Portugal over Israel in the Quarter Finals. The stadium also hosted Scotland in a 1–1 draw against the Czech Republic in an unsuccessful attempt of qualifying for the 1999 FIFA Women's World Cup, despite topping their group, losing 7–1 on aggregate to Spain.

When the club won promotion to the Scottish Premier League (SPL) in 2004, they faced a problem in that the Caledonian Stadium did not meet a SPL requirement for stadiums to have 10,000 seats. At that time, the Caledonian Stadium had a total capacity of 6,280 and only 2,280 seats. Inverness CT agreed to groundshare with Aberdeen at Pittodrie. The SPL initially rejected the groundsharing application, but accepted it on appeal. The SPL also voted to reduce the 10,000 seat requirement to 6,000. Inverness CT played at Pittodrie for the first two rounds of fixtures of the 2004–05 season, while redevelopment works were carried out at the Caledonian Stadium.

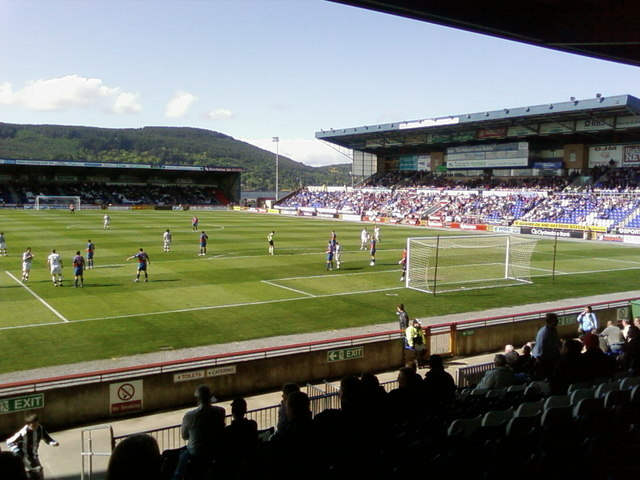
Inverness playing St Mirren in May 2008 at the Caledonian Stadium.

The redevelopment in 2004–05 included the construction of two new stands at either end of the ground, which made the stadium all-seater and increased its capacity to over 7,500. These stands were built in 47 days by the Tulloch Construction Company who are also the club's biggest shareholder. As Tulloch also paid part of the development cost, the stadium had the Tulloch name added to it on completion of the work and the lease on the site was transferred to Tulloch. The lease reverted to the football club in December 2017, except for the stadium car parks. In February 2019, the stadium was renamed the "Caledonian Stadium" after long-time sponsors Tulloch gifted the stadium to the club.

In 2007, the club added a very small stand opposite the Main Stand - called the West Stand. It has a capacity of around 400 and was initially intended to be a 'singing section'. The highest football attendance recorded at the Caledonian Stadium is 7,753, set on 20 January 2008 against Rangers.

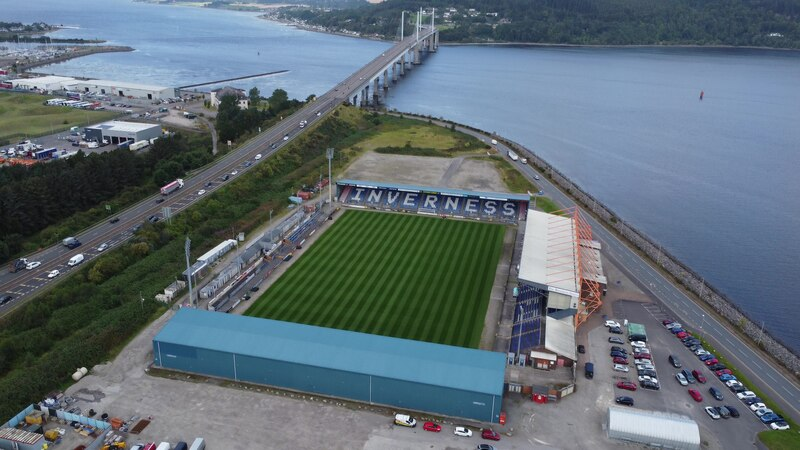
Stadium next to Moray Firth

The ground hosted the 2019 Scottish Challenge Cup Final, played between Highland club Ross County and Welsh side Connah's Quay Nomads. On 7 February 2020, a WWII ordinance was discovered near the stadium, leading to the evacuation of the stadium, the device was detonated safely an hour later, and allowing the next days Scottish Cup Fixture against Livingston to go ahead.

In March 2025, it was mentioned by local businessman and investor, Alan Savage, that the club could be looking at a move away from the Caledonian Stadium to a smaller venue at the UHI Campus, in order to stabilize finances due to the stadium being too big for League One attendances.

In August 2025, it was announced that the stadium would be renamed the SarensPSG Stadium as part of a sponsorship deal with the Belgian international construction company, Sarens, in a club record breaking deal lasting until the 2027–28 season. During the same season, the West Stand was redeveloped yet again, stripping out the seats and turning it into a terracing, with a roof to be added on at a later date.

== International Fixtures ==
Date	Tournament	Home	Score	Away
6 March 1997	Friendly	Scotland U-16	5–1	England U-16
26 April 1998	1998 UEFA U-16 Euro Group Stage	Croatia U-17	2–0	Ukraine U-17
28 April 1998	1998 UEFA U-16 Euro Group Stage	Russia U-17	0–0	Croatia U-17
30 April 1998	1998 UEFA U-16 Euro Group Stage	Ukraine U-17	2–1	Russia U-17
3 May 1998	1998 UEFA U-16 Euro Quarter Final	Israel U-17	1–4	Portugal U-17
23 May 1998	1999 Women's World Cup qualifiers	Scotland Women	1–1	Czech Republic Women
15 March 2006	Friendly	Scotland B	2–3	Turkey B
2 March 2026	Friendly	Scotland U-23 Women	0–4	Netherlands U-23 Women

== Other uses ==
In March 2001, the stadium hosted a rugby match between Caledonia Reds in their game against Edinburgh Reivers. In September 2022, the stadium was to play host to a rugby match for the first time in 21 years with Glasgow Warriors hosting Worcester Warriors, however due to uncertainty regarding Worcester Warriors' future, the match was cancelled.

The stadium first appeared as a concert venue when it successfully hosted Elton John in 2007 and its reputation was bolstered further when Rod Stewart entertained 19,400 fans there in 2010, then again in 2016, the second time entertaining 15,000 fans. Tom Jones was due to be performing a concert in his 80th Birthday Tour on 27 June 2020, and Westlife were due to be performing in the stadium on the following day for their "Stadiums in the Summer Tour", but both the tours were cancelled due to the COVID-19 pandemic. During the pandemic, the stadium was used as a drive-in cinema, showing Toy Story, Grease, Joker, and Braveheart, between 7 and 10 August.

In July 2022, the Caledonian Stadium hosted Andrea Bocelli on his Believe World tour, and Duran Duran.

== See also ==
- Stadium relocations in Scottish football
