= Gehler =

Gehler is a German surname. Notable people with the surname include:

- Johann Carl Gehler (1732–1796), German physician, mineralogist, and anatomist
- Johann Samuel Traugott Gehler (1751–1795), German lawyer and physicist
- Michael Gehler (born 1962), Austrian historian

== See also ==
- Geller
