= BCD Group =

Dutch company

BCD Group N.V.
- Type: Private
- Industry: Travel
- Founded: 4 September 1975; 50 years ago
- Founder: John Fentener van Vlissingen
- Headquarters: Utrecht, Netherlands
- Area served: Global
- Key people: Stephan Baars (CEO)
- Brands: BCD Travel
- Owner: Fentener van Vlissingen family
- Website: www.bcdgroup.com

BCD Group N.V. (formerly BCD Holdings N.V.) is a privately owned Dutch company and consists of BCD Travel (global corporate travel management and its subsidiaries BCD Meetings & Events, global meetings and events agency, and Advito, global business travel consultancy). Founded in 1975 by John Fentener van Vlissingen, BCD Group employs more than 15,000 people and operates in 170+ countries. Total sales amount to US$24.4 billion (2025).

== History ==
BCD was founded in 1975 by John Fentener van Vlissingen as a real estate management company, Property Management Advisory Services, with founding capital of US$10,000 and 2 employees. In 1976, van Vlissingen left his job at Pierson, Heldring & Pierson to focus exclusively on his company, which opened an office in Atlanta that year and changed its name to Noro Management Inc. BCD became deeply involved in real estate development in the Atlanta metro area, including shopping malls and office complexes.

In 1986, in anticipation of diversification, Noro was spun off and the remaining company was renamed BCD Holdings N.V. The company entered the travel industry in 1987 with the acquisition of WorldTravel Advisors, an Atlanta-based travel management company, and of off-airport parking operation Park 'N Fly in 1988. Park 'N Fly was sold in 2023 to Green Courte Partners.

At the beginning of 2006, TUI AG sold its subsidiary TQ3 Travel Solutions Management Holding GmbH to BCD Holdings N.V. (operating as BCD Group since 2014), which merged the three companies World Travel BTI, The Travel Company and TQ3 Travel Solutions under the name BCD Travel.
