= Robert Vinçotte =

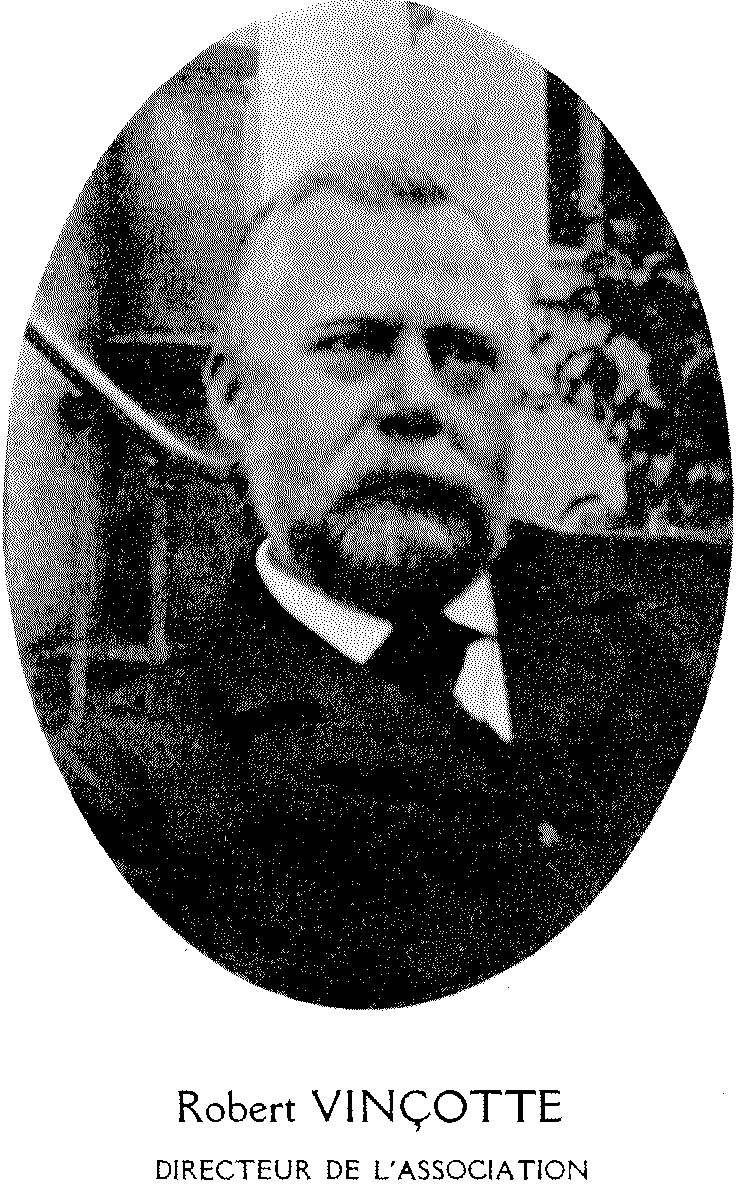
Robert Vinçotte.

Robert Vinçotte (Borgerhout, 1844-Schaerbeek, 1904) was a Belgian engineer who laid the basis for industrial workplace safety in his native country. He was involved in the founding of the two companies that would dominate the Belgian inspection and certification market during the twentieth century. He was also the brother of Thomas Vinçotte, a famous Belgian sculptor.

== Early years ==
Vinçotte was born in Antwerp. His father was Jean-Henri Vinçotte (1807–1890), a man who started out as a communal teacher but eventually, through studies in Leuven and Liège, became first a professor in Antwerp, then Ghent, and ended his career as a high school inspector (a function that was brand new and very prestigious at the time). Vinçotte Sr. was a highly respected man, once described as "la personnification du devoir et du devoir austère. Ses inspections étaient conduites de la façon la plus consciencieuse"

Robert Vinçotte also attended school in Liège and in 1865, gaining the titles of "ingénieur honoraire des mines" (honorary mining engineer) and "docteur en sciences physiques et mathématiques" (doctor in physical and mathematical sciences). In addition, he was allotted a post as a mathematics teacher at the Atheneum of Brussels, a great honour in those days. While teaching, Vinçotte deepened his explorations of the explosion of steam boilers.

In 1872 Maurice Urban, a director of the National Railway Company of Belgium, asked him to take charge of a new organisation, which would be created for the purpose of inspecting steam boilers in factories. At the time, Vinçotte expressed the problem the new association (and the whole of the industrialized world) faced as follows:

Les explosions de chaudières sont l'un des côtés fâcheux de notre situation industrielle. Désastreuses par les dégâts et les chômages qu'elles occasionnent, odieuses en ce qu'elles montrent la vie humaine pesant moins dans la balance que les dépenses préventives, elles sont, avec les autres dangers du travail, l'une des causes le plus actives à la désaffection des ouvriers.

Vinçotte went on to point out that, whereas in Great Britain there was on average one explosion for every 6000 boilers in service, for Belgium this rate was one in 1000 to 1200. He identified the main causes for this discrepancy as construction or design errors, coupled with bad maintenance, and concluded that regular inspections, as they were being performed in Britain, could decrease the number of boiler explosions in Belgium with at least 75 percent.

== Director of the association ==
Front of a handwritten inspection report, addressed to Robert Vinçotte

In August that year, 13 captains of industry and engineers gathered and set up the provisional organisation that they named the "Association pour la surveillance des chaudières à vapeur" ("Association for the Surveillance of Steam Boilers"). Its purpose was to prevent steam boilers from exploding through safety inspection and to promote a more efficient use of power. In return for a membership fee, it would provide semiannual safety inspections and staff instruction. According to the introductory letter, the association was non-profit.

Fondée dans un but philantropique, l'Association a exclu l'idée de faire des bénéfices; les ressources de l'Association seront entièrement consacrées à rendre le service aussi complet que possible.

Middle of the same inspection report. Note the underlined big "Explosion de 1895" in the middle.

The association had near to five hundred members by the end of 1872. By 1910, it would inspect more boilers than the combined inspection organisations of Germany and France. However, this success was still far away at the time: in 1873, the association only had three engineers at its disposal, one of whom was its director, Robert Vinçotte, himself. In that year, Vinçotte combined his function of director with inspecting 250 steam boilers (half of the number of steam boilers the association had registered at the end of the previous year). Vinçotte went abroad the next years, to Düsseldorf and the United States, to follow the latest innovations in steam engine and vessel technology. In 1875, he pressed the Belgian government to make inspections such as his company performed obligatory by law, something that resulted in the revised police regulations of 1884.

Vinçotte's close cooperation with the state would continue in 1881 when he travelled to the United States again, this time on request of the Belgian government to bring back knowledge of the safety measures for steam boilers of the burgeoning American industry. The result was a compilation of rules for calculating the reliability and strength of the key parts of steam boilers, later published in a textbook. Also in 1881, the association announced that, after ten years, its amount of biannually inspected steam boilers had more than quadrupled, while only 0.17 percent of them had failed in the same period.

For these and his earlier contributions to Belgian industrial safety, Vinçotte was awarded the rank of Knight in the Order of Leopold II in 1885.

In 1887, a budget surplus allowed every one of its employees a life insurance, a fund that could also be accessed upon retirement.

== Death ==
Robert Vinçotte died in 1904 after returning from a study trip to Italy, and would be replaced as a director of AV in 1909 by his son, whose first name was the same as his. He is buried in Schaerbeek. In that same year, AIB was given its second golden medal for its participation at the world exhibition in Paris. As a tribute, the "Association pour la surveillance des chaudières à vapeur" would be rebaptised in 1922 as "Association Vinçotte pour la surveillance des chaudières à vapeur", as it had already been known for some time abroad.

== See also ==
- Vinçotte (company)
- Destructive testing
- Nondestructive testing
- Product certification
- Reliability Engineering
