= Emil Kirdorf =

German industrialist (1847–1938)

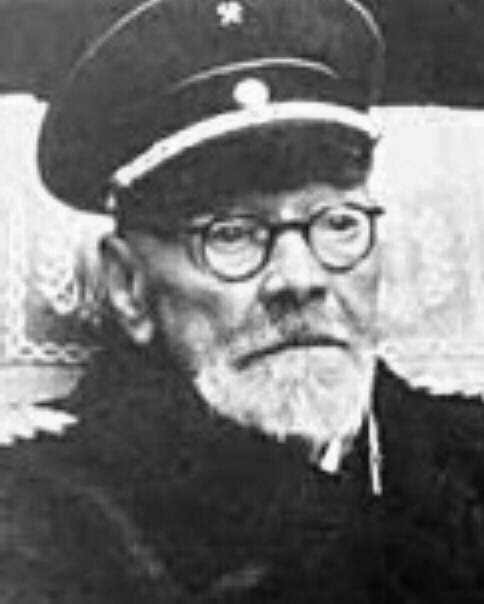
- Born: April 8, 1847; Mettmann, Rhine Province, Prussia
- Died: July 13, 1938 (aged 91); Mülheim, Nazi Germany
- Occupation: Industrialist
- Known for: One of the first important employers in the Ruhr industrial sectors

Emil Kirdorf (8 April 1847 – 13 July 1938) was a German industrialist, one of the first important employers in the Ruhr industrial sectors. He was personally awarded by Adolf Hitler the Order of the German Eagle, Nazi Germany's highest distinctions, on his 90th birthday in 1937, for his support to the Nazi Party in the late 1920s.

== Biography ==
Emil Kirdorf was born at Mettmann, Rhine Province. His father was a wealthy owner of a weaving mill. He had a brother named Adolf who would be his business partner during his adult life. Kirdorf volunteered a year in 1864 in Hamburg to work in an export enterprise. A year later, he worked in a textile company in Krefeld. The family's mill went bankrupt, mainly because of the management's refusal to introduce mechanical looms. Kirdorf therefore changed to the mining industry in which he worked as an accountant. Following the Franco-Prussian War, he became director of Zeche Holland in 1871. Two years later, the entrepreneur Friedrich Grillo offered him the position of commercial director in the Gelsenkirchener Bergwerks-AG (GBAG) company. He became general manager of GBAG in 1893. He steered the company through the Long Depression of the 1870s, and held this position until 1926.

Under his direction, the GBAG became the largest coal mine enterprise in Europe, and Emil Kirdorf became known as the "Chimney Baron" (Schlotbaron). Hansa, Zollern and Germania companies were integrated into GBAG under Kirdorf's leadership. Kirdorf then was one of the main founders of the Rhenish-Westphalian Coal Syndicate employers union in 1893, member of its board of directors until 1913. 98 mine enterprises of the Ruhr belonged to this union, which tried, among others aims, to prevent dumping.

Kirdorf was also one of the founding members of the pangermanist Alldeutscher Verband league in 1891, which advocated imperialist policies. He was also a founding member of the Free Ukraine association, of the German Colonial Association (founded in 1882) and of the Flottenverein, a lobby in favour of extension of the Kaiserliche Marine against the British Navy.

After World War I, he was a co-founder of the Economic Association for the Promotion of the Forces of Spiritual Renewal (German: Wirtschaftsvereinigung zur Förderung der geistigen Wiederaufbaukräfte), which subsidized Alfred Hugenberg's media empire. In September 1918, it demanded the resignation of Emperor Wilhelm II.

The GBAG thereafter concentrated on its coal activities. Kirdorf lost his key position to Hugo Stinnes, to whose management policies he was vehemently opposed. Stinnes intended to make GBAG into the basis of a German trust, which was opposed by Kirdorf. After Stinnes' death in 1924, Kirdorf regained his position and entered the executive committee. In 1926, the GBAG formed the Vereinigte Stahlwerke, of which it controlled 15%. Other groups included ThyssenKrupp (26%) and Phoenix AG für Bergbau und Hüttenbetrieb.

Kirdorf died in Mülheim in 1938.

== Role during Nazi Germany ==
Kirdorf was well known as a reactionary for his authoritarian and anti-democratic views. He rejected the Weimar Republic and fought the workers' movement and trade unions. According to his conceptions, the state and the entrepreneurs had to organize social order. Thus, he became an active promoter of Hitler's rise to power. He met him for the first time on 4 July 1927, and funded the NSDAP. Kirdorf then joined the NSDAP in 1927, but left it the following year, alleging as the reason the influence of Gregor Strasser on the party. On 1 August 1929, he was invited as a guest of to the Nazi Party's Congress in Nuremberg. Kirdorf joined the NSDAP again in 1934. He mainly supported it in order to divert the working class from Marxism. It was also at Kirdorf's instigation that Hitler wrote Der Weg zum Wiederaufstieg (The Road to Recovery) in 1927, intended for exclusive distribution to, and consumption by, the leading industrialists of Germany.

On 26 October 1927, fourteen industrial employers attended a lecture by Hitler in the Kirdorf's house. Kirdorf then organized, in August 1931, an exchange of views between Hitler and representatives of the steel industry. Joseph Goebbels noted in his diary, on 15 November 1936:

“How poor we were then. Führer tells how he once wanted to shoot himself because the bill debts grew over his head. Kirdorf helped him with 100,000 marks."

Hitler personally awarded to him, on 10 April 1937, the date of Kirdorf's 90th birthday, the Order of the German Eagle, the highest distinction of the Third Reich. He benefited on 13 July 1938 from a state funeral in Gelsenkirchen, with Hitler depositing a crown on his coffin.

== See also ==
- Nazi Germany
- Hitler's rise to power

== Sources ==
- Ashby Turner, Henry (1972). Fascism and Capitalism in Germany. Göttingen.
- Gossweiler, Kurt (1988). Essays on Fascism. Berlin.
