= John Fentener van Vlissingen =

Dutch businessman (1939–2025)

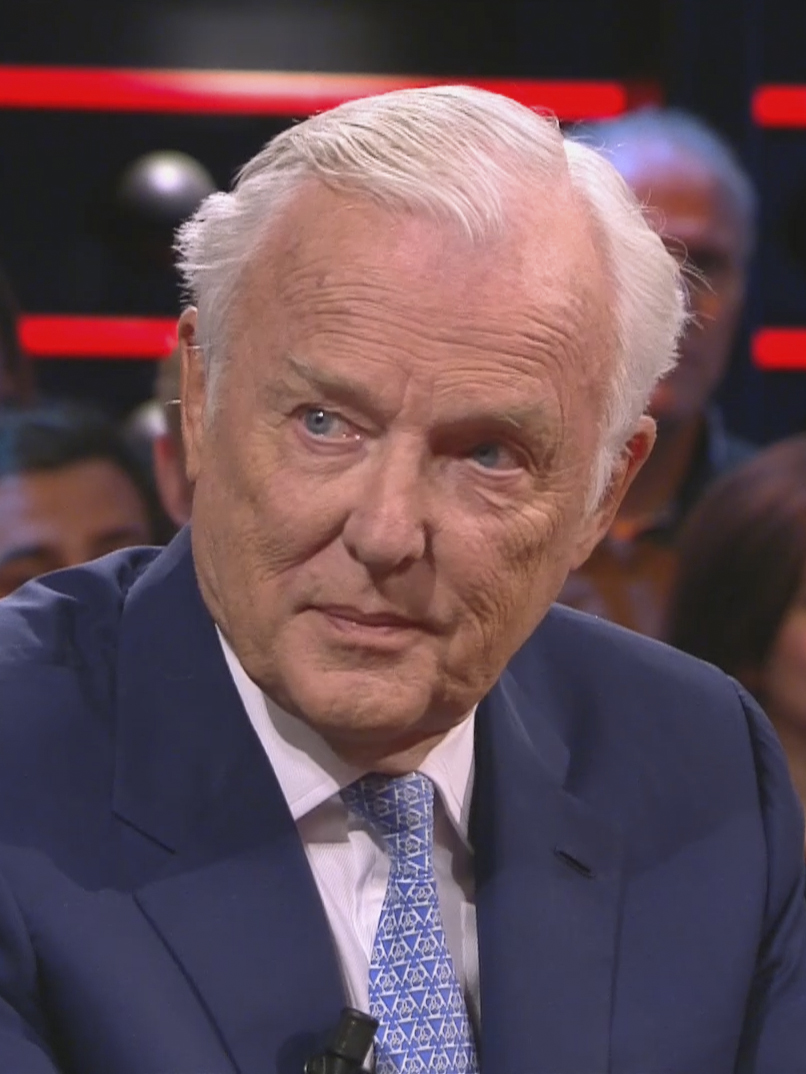
- Fentener van Vlissingen in 2018
- Born: John Arthur Fentener van Vlissingen; 4 March 1939; Utrecht, Netherlands
- Died: 11 December 2025 (aged 86)
- Years active: 1957–2025
- Spouse: Marine Fentener van Vlissingen (m. 1964)
- Children: 3
- Parent: Jan Fentener van Vlissingen
- Relatives: Paul Fentener van Vlissingen (brother)

John Arthur Fentener van Vlissingen (4 March 1939 – 11 December 2025) was a Dutch businessman. He was one of the wealthiest people in the Netherlands and made major investments in the travel industry. The total capital of the family is, according to Quote magazine, around €9.2 billion. The wealth of Fentener van Vlissingen was calculated to be €1.6 billion in Quote 500.

Of the three brothers (Frits, who died in March 2006, and Paul, who died in August 2006) only John Fentener van Vlissingen's career was not with the family company, SHV Holdings. He began his own company, BCD Holdings N.V., a market leader in the travel industry.

BCD Holdings began as a real estate company in 1975 as Property Management Advisory Services. In 1976, the company was renamed NORO since the name NIRO was already appropriated. In 1986, BCD was founded, after the separation of Noro management advisories and investments by the establishment of BCD. In 1987, WorldTravel Advisors was purchased. In 1999, WorldTravel Advisors merged with BTI Americas to form WorldTravel BTI. In 2006, WorldTravel BTI was renamed BCD Travel with the takeover of the German company, TQ3, and the dissolution of the BTI brand, thus creating the third largest travel company in the United States.

Fentener van Vlissingen died on 11 December 2025, at the age of 86.
