= Rhenish-Westphalian Coal Syndicate =

German coal company and cartel

The Rhenish-Westphalian Coal Syndicate (ger.: Rheinisch-Westfälisches Kohlen-Syndikat; abbreviated as RWKS) was a cartel established in 1893 in Essen bringing together the major coal producers in the Ruhr.

The syndicate was set up as coal producers moved towards using shipping rather than railways to deliver their coal to Rotterdam. The cartel co-operated with the Dutch Coal Trade Union, to whom they gave the sole distribution rights for Westphalian coal. Daniël George van Beuningen of the Steenkolen Handels Vereniging was a leading figure in this relationship, greatly increasing the amount of coal imported to Rotterdam and resulting in the cost of using Rhine based barges dropping as their greater use also stimulated technical innovation.

This arrangement led to Rotterdam becoming not just the leading coal transhipment port in the Netherlands but also evolving into the major bunker port in Europe. In 1913 this coal transhipment accounted for over two thirds of the total shipping on the Rhine. By this time the Rhenish-Westphalian Coal Syndicate accounted for 93% of the coal output in the Ruhr and 54% of Germany as a whole.

Emil Kirdorf, an early Nazi party member, was one of the main founders of the Rhenish-Westphalian Coal Syndicate. After the defeat of Nazi Germany in World War II, many members of the coal industry were arrested for their role in the Third Reich.

== History ==
The RWKS was founded in February 1893 by Emil Kirdorf as the successor to various smaller mining cartels. The syndicate, as the main energy supplier to the German Reich and the main coke supplier in continental Europe, was always economically important and controversial:

- In 1900, poor planning and/or excessive profit-seeking led to the so-called coal shortage, a supply crisis.
- In 1901, the pricing policy of the Rhenish-Westphalian Coal Syndicate triggered the Kartellenquete, a committee of inquiry into the role of the cartels.
- Between 1904 and 1911 there were greater tensions between the RWKS and the mining treasury (the Prussian state and its Ruhr mines). In 1904, the syndicate thwarted the takeover of the Hibernia mining company by the Prussian state, which in turn retaliated by being reluctant to approve new explorations.
- In 1912 the Prussian state mines were associated with the RWKS, but this association was terminated in 1913.
- In 1915, the syndicate threatened to collapse due to the conflicting interests of its members, which had intensified due to the war. The extension of the syndicate contract was only possible under government pressure.
- After the November Revolution of 1918, the coal syndicate was transformed into a semi-public corporation with the participation of the Free State of Prussia with expanded co-determination.
- In 1923, its headquarters were briefly relocated to Hamburg during the French occupation of the Ruhr area.
- In 1934 the cartel was supplemented by the mines in the Aachen mining district and in 1935 by those in the Saarland, and was then sometimes called the “West German coal syndicate”.
- In 1941, the RWKS, as a forced cartel, became part of the Reich Coal Association, a steering association of the National Socialist economy.
- Before the end of the war in 1945, the sales areas of the Bavarian pitch coal mines within the RWKS were determined.
- In 1945 the cartel was officially dissolved by the occupying forces. The military government of the British occupied zone had 44 leading representatives of the syndicate members arrested on September 7, 1945. However, the functions of the RWKS were essentially retained; they were taken over and exercised by successor organizations, which were primarily named differently. These were the Deutscher Kohlenverkauf (German Coal Sale) from 1947 to 1952 and the Gemeinschaftsorganisation Ruhrkohle (GEORG) (Ruhr Coal Community Organization) from 1952 to 1956. The later Ruhrkohle AG, which began in 1968, can be seen as a continuation of the RWKS in corporate form.

== See also ==
- F. H. Fentener van Vlissingen
