= SHV Holdings =

Dutch trading company

SHV Holdings N.V.
- Type: Privately held holding company
- Founded: April 1, 1896; 130 years ago
- Headquarters: Utrecht, Netherlands
- Area served: Worldwide
- Key people: Floris De Ryck, CEO
- Brands: SHV Energy; Makro; Mammoet; Nutreco; NPM Capital; Kiwa; ONE-Dyas
- Revenue: ▲EUR 21 billion (2025)
- Net income: ▼EUR 526 million (2025)
- Owner: Fentener van Vlissingen family
- Website: www.shv.nl

SHV Holdings is a privately owned Dutch trading company, regarded as one of the world's largest private trading groups. SHV is a highly diversified company, with interests in transport, retail, oil, food, Testing, Inspection & Certification and financial services . It currently employs more than 60,255 people and is present in 72 countries.

== History ==
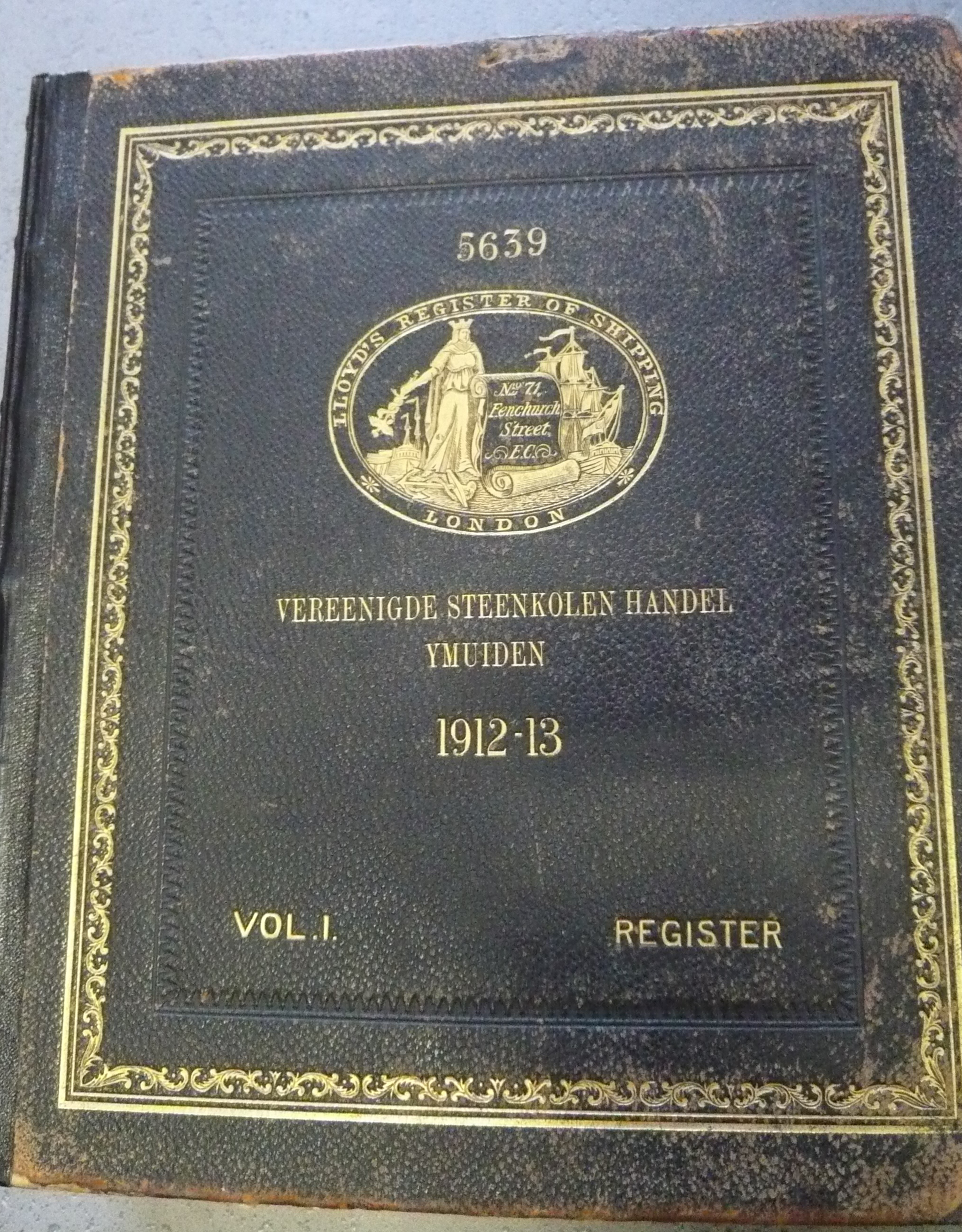
One of a series of old Lloyd's registers from former SHV offices in IJmuiden. Currently in the library of the Zee- en Haven Museum there. The SHV managed the transport of coal ("Steenkool") in the IJmuiden harbour.

=== 1896–1939 ===
On 1 April 1896, eight Dutch coal wholesalers merged to found the Steenkolen Handels-Vereniging (Coal-trading company), sometimes known as the 'Dutch Coal Trade Union', as a response to the formation of the German Rhenish-Westphalian Coal Syndicate (Rheinisch-Westfälisches Kohlen-Syndikat). Daniël George van Beuningen was one of the leading figures in the organisation. It represented the Rhenish-Westphalian Coal Syndicate in the Netherlands.

By 1904, the company had secured exclusive rights to trade Westphalian coal in the Netherlands. Under the guidance of director Frits "FH" Fentener van Vlissingen, SHV's stature in the Netherlands went from strength to strength. Under his direction, SHV moved its headquarters from Rotterdam to Utrecht, to take advantage of the city's position as the hub of the Dutch railway network. By 1910, SHV had positioned itself as one of the foremost trading forces in the Netherlands.

Thanks to his expertise in the coal trading business, Fentener van Vlissingen was appointed as director of the State Coal Board, which managed coal distribution in the Netherlands during the First World War. Although the Netherlands was neutral, the war years were difficult for SHV, as Westphalian coal output was assigned to support the German war effort. Nevertheless, in 1917 SHV established a holding company, Administratiekantoor Unitas to exploit a German anthracite mine. This entity (simply called "Unitas") became SHV's first investment arm, providing foundation capital for companies like Koninklijke Hoogovens and KLM.

The 1920s also brought about a major change in the Dutch industrial sector: a slump in fishing led to the consolidation of three major shipping companies and their new energy needs also affected the SHV. In response to these changes, SHV established its first oil bunker station and sold crude for the motor vessels of the recently merged shipping companies. The shifts in energy economics in the Netherlands followed changes taking place around the world. In 1914, close to 94% of ships around the world were fuelled by coal; by 1939 this had fallen to 48%. Oil was preferred over coal because it burned more efficiently: in some cases, shipping companies saved up to 40% in operating costs by switching to motor vessels. S.H.V. was directed by Daniel George van Beuningen who took over from his father.

=== 1940–1970 ===
On 10 May 1940, Germany attacked Belgium, France, Luxembourg and the Netherlands. After four days of fighting, the Dutch government capitulated and the occupation of the Netherlands began.

After the war, SHV had to cope with the economic difficulties of a continent in ruins. As coal's importance continued to decrease, SHV expanded its interests in shipping and retail. In 1964, the company established the Makro cash-and-carry stores.

=== 1970–1999 ===
By 1995 SHV was the largest trading company in the Netherlands.

=== 2000–present ===
In April 2015, SHV completed the takeover of animal feed manufacturer Nutreco

In July 2021, SHV purchased Kiwa, a Dutch testing, inspection and certification (TIC) institution.

== Corporate Affairs ==
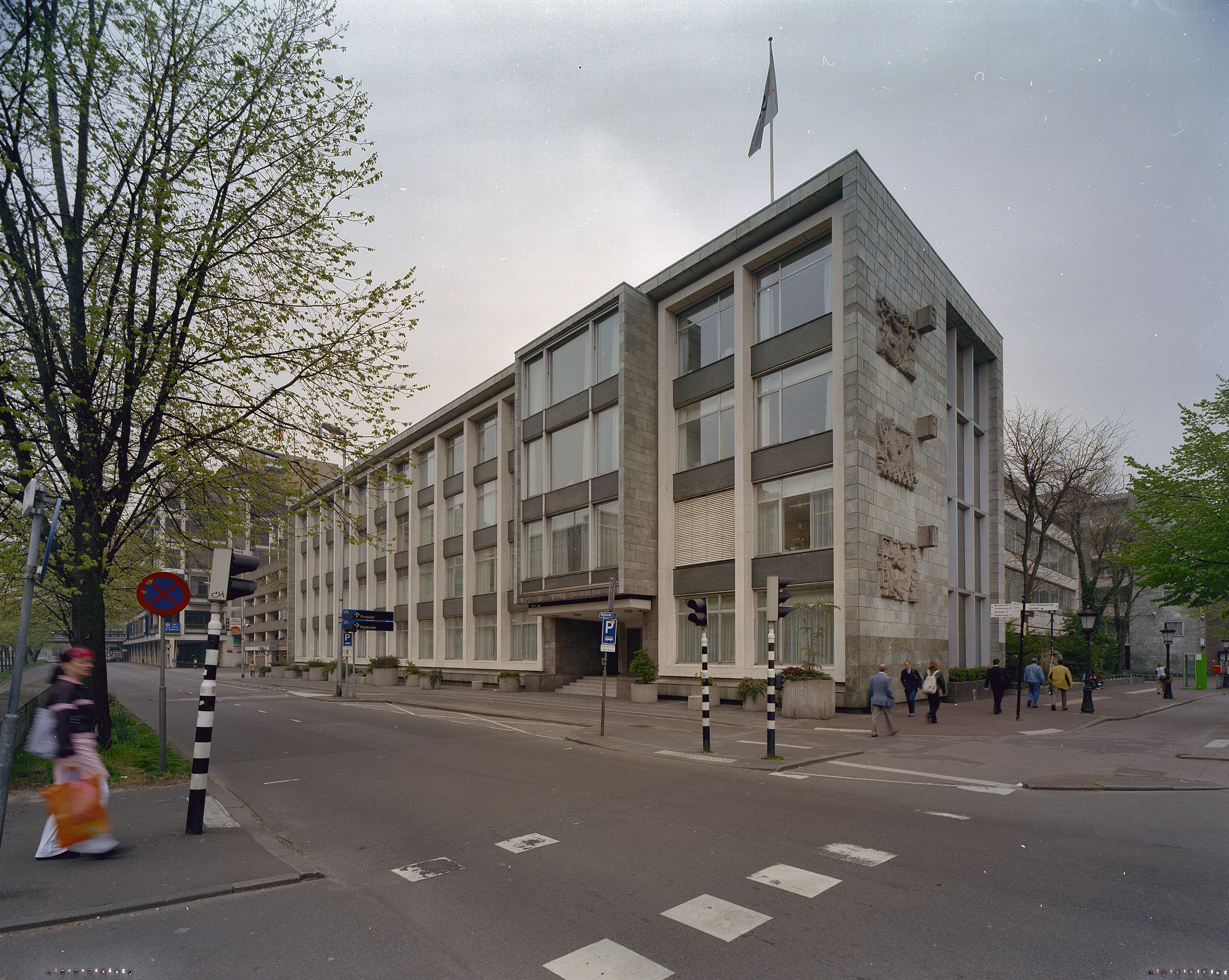
SHV Headquarters in Utrecht

=== Management ===
Floris de Ryck has been the CEO of SHV Holdings since April 2024.

=== Logo ===
Coat of arms of Utrecht

The SHV logo is inspired by the coat of arms of Utrecht, to which SHV moved from Rotterdam under the directorship of FH Fentener van Vlissingen.

== Companies owned by SHV Holdings ==
- SHV Energy – Liquefied petroleum gas
- Makro – Food and non-food consumer articles in South America
- Mammoet - Heavy lifting and transport
- Nutreco - Animal nutrition and feed
- NPM Capital - Private equity
- Kiwa - Testing, inspection and certification
- ONE-Dyas - Exploration and production operating company of oil and gas
