= Daniël George van Beuningen =

Dutch businessman (1877–1955)

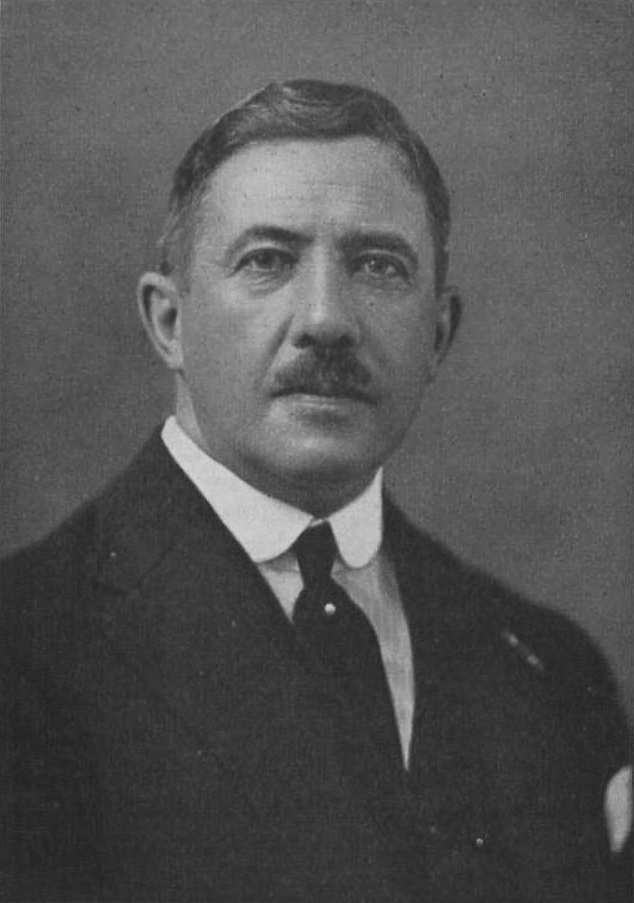
van Beuningen in 1938

Daniël George van Beuningen (4 March 1877 – 29 May 1955) was a Dutch businessman.

== Early life ==
Van Beuningen was born in Utrecht, on 4 March 1877, as the son of Hendrik Adriaan van Beuningen and Anna Lavenia Brain of Kelmscott. However, he made his reputation in Rotterdam where he focused on the economic transformation of the port of that city, which became one of the largest ports in the world at the time. He was a well known celebrity, not only in the city itself but also across the Netherlands and further afield.

== Steel and coal ==
His father was co-founder of the Steenkolen Handels Vereniging, which became important during the World War I supplying both the English and German armies with coal. Daniël was involved as a prominent member of the Dutch Coal Trade Union, an organisation which represented the Rhenish-Westphalian Coal Syndicate in the Netherlands. He started shipping German coal to Rotterdam to compete with coal imported from the United Kingdom. This involved using barges rather than railway wagons to ship coal and led to major advances in the mechanical handling of coal. Van Beuningen went on to lead a large number of companies in the port of Rotterdam, and after the war he owned most of these companies and became active in Rotterdam society. In 1937, he was one of the co-financial partners of the newly built Stadion Feijenoord, buying the ground where the stadium was built and was one of the founders for the Harbour Hospital in the city. During the World War II in 1941 he resigned. In 1954, several months before his death in Arlesheim, on 29 May 1955, aged 78. The Van Beuningen family was forced to withdraw completely out of the SHV Holdings, as there was no placeable family member to become director.

== Art collector ==
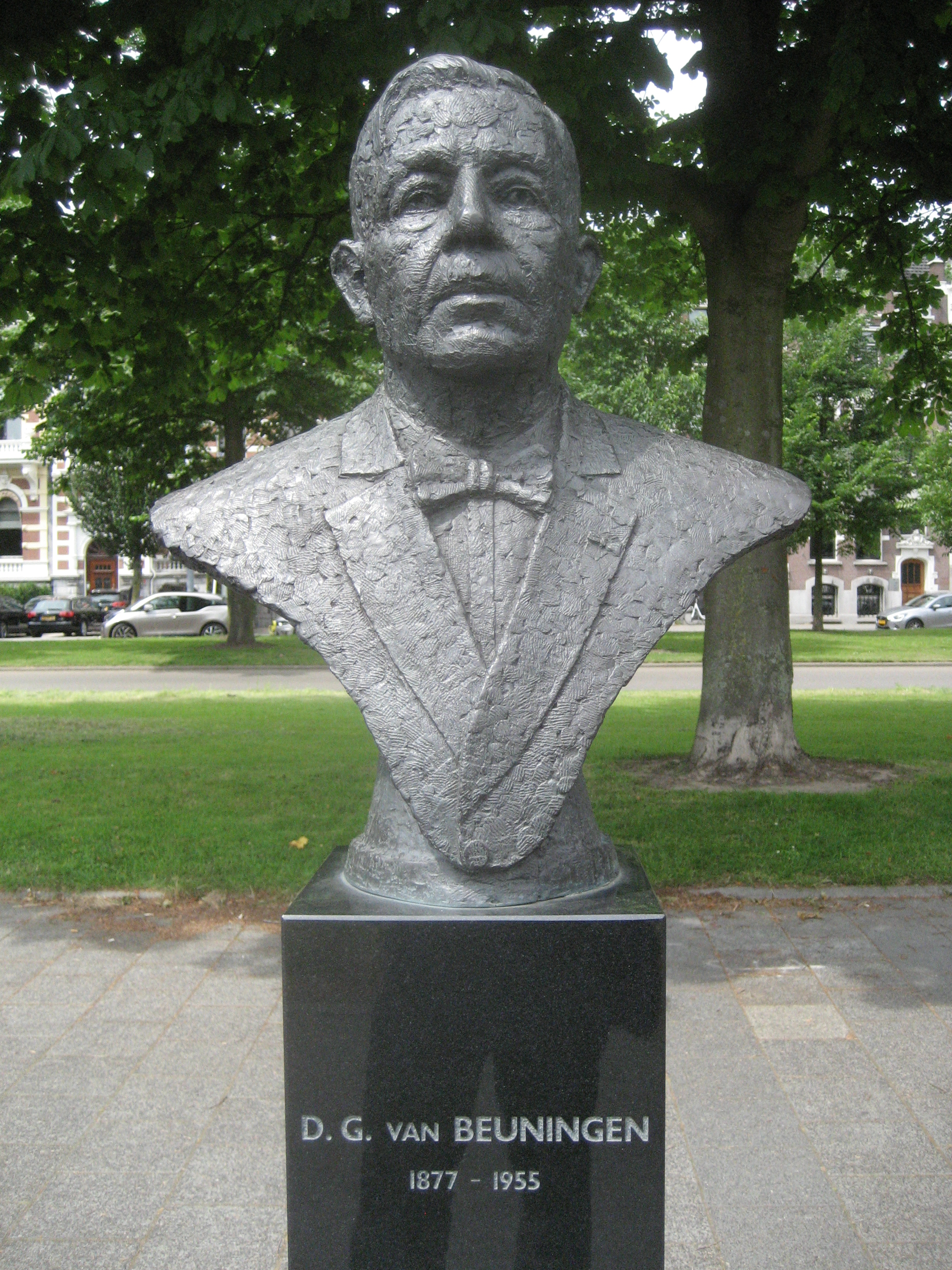
Bust of Van Beuningen in Rotterdam

Van Beuningen was a collector of art from the 15th and 16th century out of the northern and southern parts of the Netherlands. During his life he gave several of his collections away to the Museum Boijmans Van Beuningen.

His sales of paintings in 1941 to Hans Posse for the planned Führermuseum of Adolf Hitler in Linz are the subject of controversy, in particular concerning drawings from the Koenigs collection.

== Family life ==
Van Beuningen married three times. His first marriage was to Mies Schout Velthuys, but because of his hard work they hardly saw each other. She died in 1926, aged 43. A short second marriage to Odette Paule Fernande Ragoulleau ended in divorce. In 1938, he married for a third time to Bep Charlouis.

His grandnephew Willem van Dedem was also a noted art collector.

== See also ==
- Dirk Hannema
- Franz Koenigs
- Hans Posse
