= Mammoet =

Dutch heavy object transport equipment company

- Type: Private
- Industry: Logistics, transport
- Headquarters: Schiedam, Netherlands
- Key people: Joost Goderie (CEO)
- Owner: SHV Holdings
- Number of employees: 5,000 approx.(2024)
- Website: www.mammoet.com

Mammoet (Dutch for mammoth) is a privately held Dutch company specializing in the engineered heavy lifting and transport of large objects.

The company works in the energy and infrastructure sectors, including the petrochemical sector, mining and metals plants, civil construction and the power sector - including nuclear power, conventional power and the offshore wind sector.

Mammoet is both a crane and transport service provider and engineering business. Alongside German company Scheuerle, it developed the Self-propelled Modular Transporter in 1983 - a piece of equipment that is now standard for heavy site transportations.

It has also developed and owns many of the world's strongest ring cranes, as well as large jacking, skidding and gantry lifting systems.

It employs around 5,000 people across over 100 locations globally, and has a fleet of approximately 1,100 cranes, and 5,500 axles of transport equipment.

== History ==
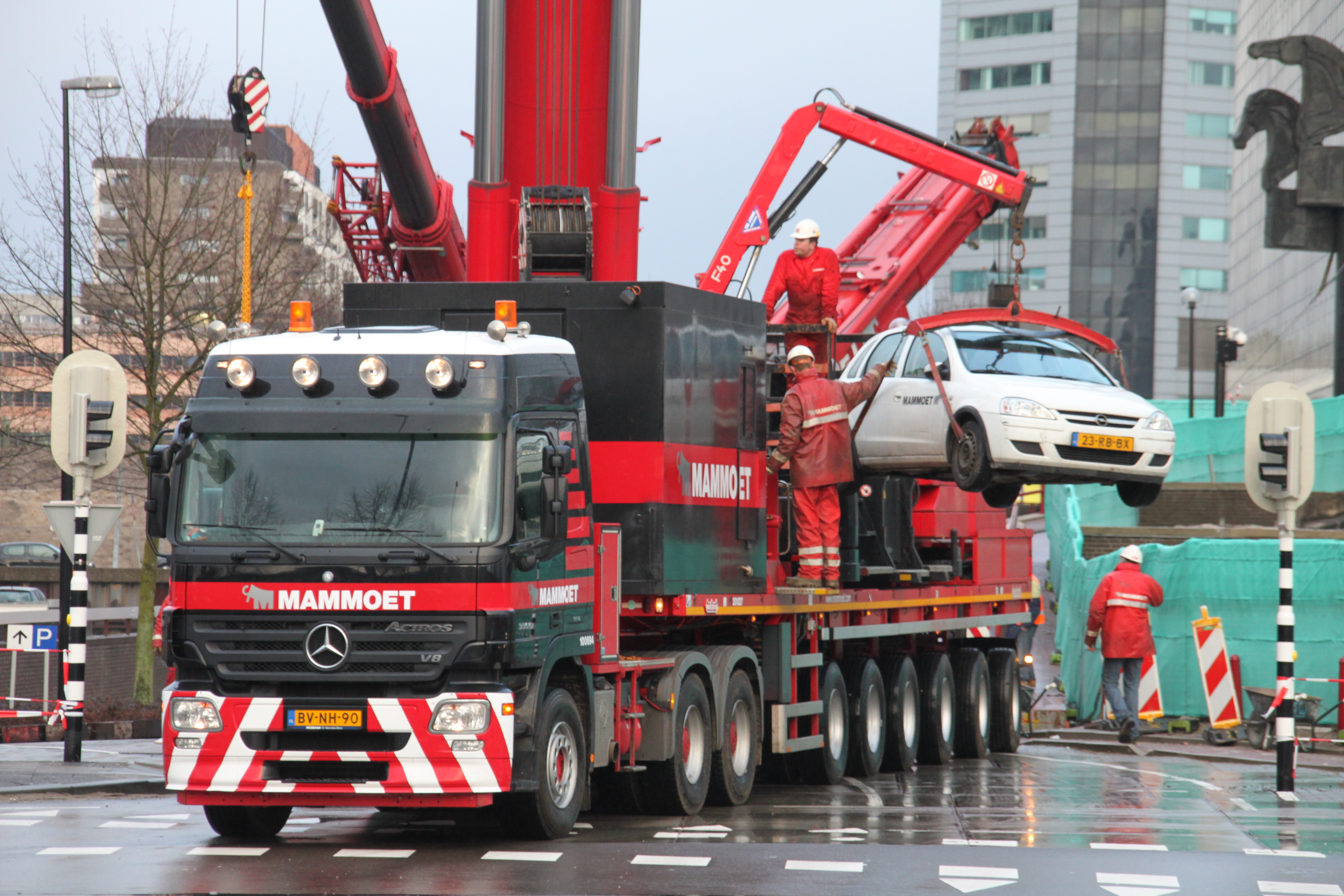
Mammoet loading one of its own cars after a job in Utrecht.

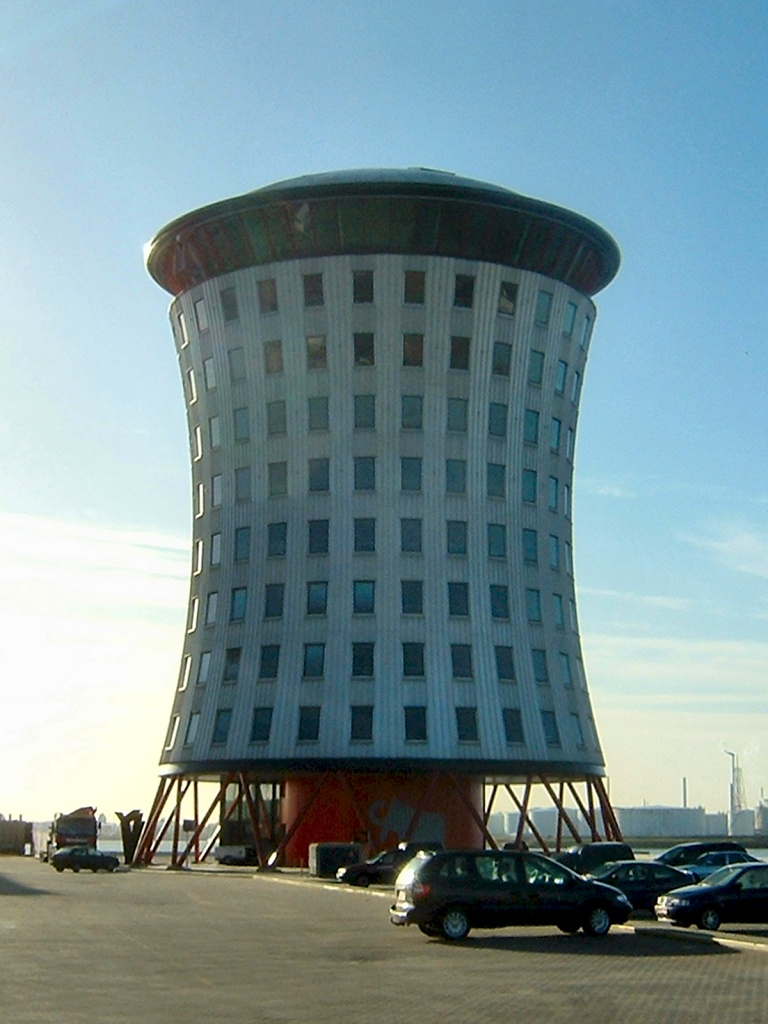
Mammoet Office Building 'The Bollard' in Schiedam

Mammoet was founded on the 13th of May 1807 in Utrecht (Netherlands), when Dutch entrepreneur Jan Goedkoop founded a maritime company with the purchase of a 140-tonne cargo vessel. The company, called 'Gebroeders Goedkoop' ('Goedkoop Brothers'), offered both maritime cargo and passenger transport. In 1862, the company acquired its first tugboat, and from 1920 onwards, the company focused on tug and salvage services.

In 1971, Goedkoop merged with Van Wezel from Hengelo (Netherlands): a company that specialized in heavy transport and cranes. The new company was called Mammoet Transport. In 1972, another company was acquired, Stoof Breda, which at that time was one of the market leaders in engineered heavy lifting and transport in the Netherlands.

In 1973, Mammoet Transport became a subsidiary of Koninklijke Nederlandse Stoomboot-Maatschappij (KNSM) located in Amsterdam. At the same time, the company name was changed to Mammoet. In 1973, Mammoet Shipping was founded.

In 1981, KNSM and Mammoet became part of Nedlloyd Group. In 2000, Mammoet was acquired by, and merged with, Van Seumeren Kraanbedrijf, a company that had been founded in 1966. In 2001, Mammoet sold its maritime branch Mammoet Shipping to shipping company Spliethoff Group, and was rebranded to BigLift Shipping.

In 2020, Mammoet merged with UK-based engineered heavy-lifting company ALE - itself the third-largest company in the industry at the time - consilidating the largest engineered heavy-lifting and transport company in the world.

In 2023, Mammoet received permission from the Russian government to sell its Russian subsidiary to Chinese Conglomerate Tianjin co Ltd. Due to the Russo-Ukrainian war, SHV stopped all its new operations and investments.

Today, the company is active in the petrochemical industry, the mining and metals industry, civil construction and the energy sector - including the nuclear power, conventional power, offshore wind, and onshore wind sub-sectors. Its work covers the front-end engineering, fabrication, assembly, logistics, construction, operation, maintenance and decommissioning phases.

Globally, approximately 5,000 people work for the company, in over 100 offices and branches worldwide. The head office of the holding company is located in Schiedam (Netherlands).

Mammoet has been involved in many high-profile projects, including the raising of the London Eye in 1999; the salvage of the Kursk nuclear submarine in 2001; the installation of the Chernobyl New Safe Confinement in 2016, and the transport of Kiruna Church in 2025. The company performed the largest land lift in industrial history - of the 42,870t Arkutun Dagi topside in Korea in 2014.

== American Market ==
Mammoet established its first United States-based office in 1989 in Rosharon, Texas, where they were awarded the factory to foundation contract for the Red Dog Project in Alaska. After that, the company acquired the Davenport and Sons, a transport company based out of east Texas to secure rights to using their SPMT (Self Propelled Modular Transporters) in Texas and Louisiana.

Mammoet used several different trucks for their upfits in the American market, including Mack RD800's, Mack Titans, Mack F700's, Mack M45SX's, Peterbilt 379's, Western Star 4900 SA's, Kenworth T800's, Kenworth W990's, Kenworth C509's, Kenworth C500B's, Kenworth 848's, and more.

== Executive Board of Management ==
The following persons are active on Mammoet's Executive Board of Management:

- Joost Goderie, Chief Executive Officer
- Jan Kleijn, Chief Operating Officer
- Bert Groenewegen, Chief Financial Officer

== Use of 'Mammoet' and logo by other companies ==
Two (former) units of Mammoet use a similar logo:

- Mammoet Road Cargo, heavy and special road transport. Now only 10% owned by Mammoet.
- Mammoet Ferry Transport, transport company between the UK and continental Europe. Now an independent company.

== Equipment ==
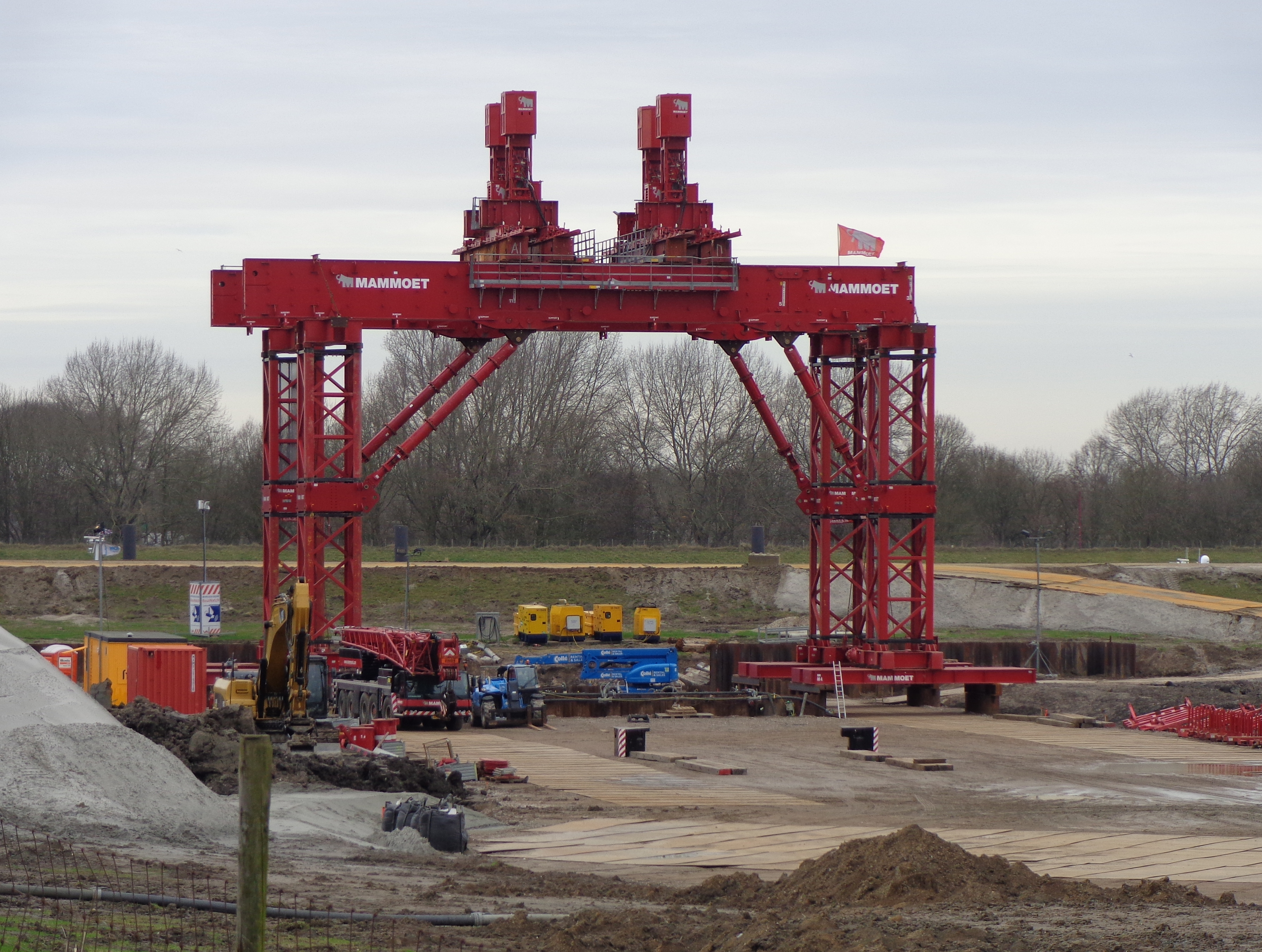
Mammoet gantry system

Mammoet's fleet includes a mixture of both heavy lifting and heavy transport equipment. It is the largest fleet of its kind in the world.

It contains more than 1,100 cranes, with around 850 wheeled mobile cranes and around 210 crawler or lattice cranes). Its crane equipment has over 3.7 million tonne-meters of lifting capacity, cumulatively - the most in its industry.

Mammoet also has over 4,000 axles of SPMT, nearly 1,400 conventional modular trailers and around 400 heavy transport trucks. It therefore has over 220,000 tonnes of cumulative transport capacity - again, the most in its industry.

Mammoet purchases most of its mobile and crawler cranes from manufacturers such as Liebherr, Terex, Manitowoc and others. It develops its own equipment as well, such as ring cranes. Mammoet's SK and PTC series of ring cranes were designed and built by the company in-house.

Aside from cranes and transport equipment, the company's fleet also includes gantry systems, jacking equipment, skidding equipment and marine equipment, such as winches, ballasting systems and mooring systems.

Mammoet has also developed electric variants of its equipment, including SPMTs and SK ring cranes.

=== Types of equipment in the company's fleet ===
- Cranes
- Self-propelled Modular Transporters
- Ballast tractors
- Heavy haulers
- Hydraulic modular trailers
- Ring cranes
- Jacking systems
- Skidding systems
- Weighing systems
- Lifting systems
- Telescopic hydraulic gantry systems

== Notable projects ==
=== Chernobyl New Safe Confinement ===
Mammoet aided in the construction and installation of the arch-shaped New Safe Confinement following the Chernobyl disaster of April 1986. It was Mammoet's scope to install the 36,200-tonne shelter, skidding it from the nearby construction site to its destination.

=== London Eye ===
Mammoet was contracted to erect the London Eye, engineering its raising from a horizontal position over the River Thames, to its current vertical position. This operation was carried out in October 1999.

=== Raising of the Kursk submarine ===
In October 2001, Mammoet was part of the international team that raised the Soviet nuclear submarine Kursk (K-141), following the Kursk submarine disaster. Over five months, a team of 100 engineers designed and built over 3,000 tonnes of lifting equipment, which raised the vessel 108 meters from the seabed.

=== Kiruna Church relocation ===
In 2025, Mammoet relocated Kiruna Church in Sweden, due to expansion at the nearby Kiruna mine. This operation took place over two days following 1,000 hours of planning. The 713-tonne, 113-year-old church building was moved approximately five kilometers across the town.

== See also ==
- Kursk submarine disaster
- Chernobyl New Safe Confinement
- Kiruna church
