= Nutreco =

Dutch producer of animal nutrition, fish feed and processed meat products

Nutreco N.V.
- Company type: Naamloze vennootschap
- Traded as: Euronext: NUO
- Industry: Food processing
- Founded: 1994
- Headquarters: Amersfoort, Netherlands
- Area served: Global
- Key people: Bastiaan van Tilburg(CEO), Pieter van Holten (CFO)
- Products: Animal nutrition, fish food, processed poultry and meats
- Revenue: €5.229 billion (2012)
- Operating income: €235.2 million (2012)
- Net income: €177.6 million (2012)
- Total equity: €2.817 billion (end 2012)
- Owner: €975.0 million (end 2012)
- Number of employees: 9,717 (average, 2012)
- Parent: SHV Holdings

Nutreco N.V. is a Dutch producer of animal nutrition, fish feed and processed meat products. It has about 100 production facilities in more than 30 countries, and eight research centers. The company was founded in 1994 after a Cinven-backed management buyout of the feed and nutrition division of BP. Nutreco was listed on Euronext Amsterdam from 1997 until 2015, when the company was delisted following its acquisition by SHV Holdings.

== History ==
Nutreco was formed in 1994.

In December 2014, Nutreco acquired Fatec and BRNova, two Brazilian animal nutrition companies, for an undisclosed amount.

In 2025, the company expressed interest in acquiring DSM-Firmenich’s animal nutrition division.
