= ALE (company) =

UK company specialising in heavy transport and lifting

Abnormal Load Engineering
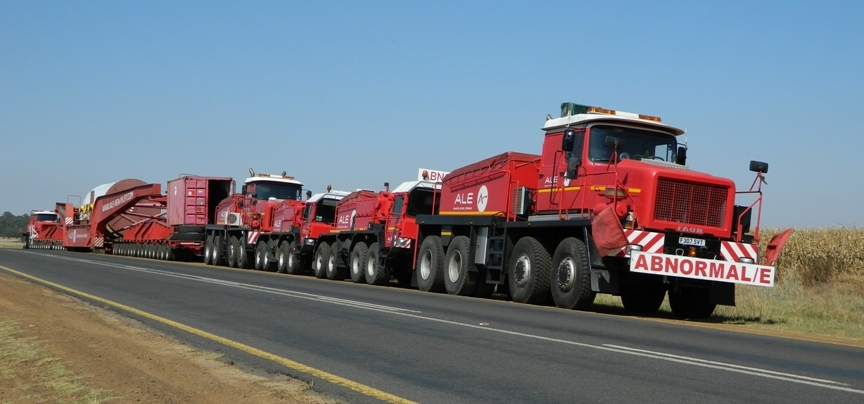
- ALE heavy road haulage units
- Industry: Heavy lifting and transportation
- Founded: 1983
- Founder: Roger Harries
- Headquarters: Hixon, UK
- Number of employees: 1,800
- Website: http://www.ale-heavylift.com/

ALE was a privately held UK company specialising in heavy transport and lifting, including transportation and installation of heavy items. It was acquired by the Dutch firm Mammoet in January 2020.

== History ==
ALE, which is an abbreviation of Abnormal Load Engineering, was founded in 1983 in the UK. The company currently operates in numerous countries and has over 40 branches around the world. The global headquarters is based in Hixon, Staffordshire, UK. The Research and Development (R&D) division is based in Breda, the Netherlands.

ALE has acquired several companies over the years including Brambles Heavy Contracting in 2002, Alstom Distribution Services Division in 2005, UK-based John Gibson Projects in 2007 and the Dutch firm Conbit in 2017.

The company has worked on several high-profile projects, including the Earls Court residential redevelopment, the RRS Sir David Attenborough polar research ship and Mordovia Arena, host for the 2018 FIFA World Cup.

In 2017 ALE performed the largest single lift by a crane in the UK, involving a 1,500t portal beam on a site at Earls Court in London. The same year the company performed another global first, lifting a 3,000t module in Brazil. ALE transported the salvaged South Korean ferry, MV Sewol, using a record number of self-propelled modular transporter.

In July 2019, Mammoet signed an agreement to acquire ALE due to the intention of the second generation of owners not to continue with the business. The acquisition was completed in January 2020.

== Equipment ==
ALE makes use of a variety of equipment to perform its services. This includes transport systems, ballast systems, jacking, barges, skidding systems, auxiliary, weighing systems and cranes, as well as their own bespoke equipment. Some of the most advanced and cutting-edge equipment forms part of ALE’s Innovation Series.

=== Mega Jack ===
The Mega Jack is a jacking system consisting of several towers. The tower’s bases contain hydraulic jacks. The capacity of each tower is 5,200t and the whole system is capable of lifting 52,000t to a height of 25 metres. The Mega Jack was launched in 2011. It is self-erecting and has been adapted and improved over the years to increase its lifting capacity.

=== Mega Jack 800 ===
ALE owns two Mega Jack 800 systems. The first was launched in 2014 and the second in 2017. It consists of four 12 metre towers, including starter cassettes and bracing cassettes to connect braces for jacking higher. The capacity of each tower is 800t.

=== AL.SK cranes ===
The AL.SK190 crane was launched in 2008 with a lifting capacity of up to 4,300t. This was followed by the AL.SK350 in 2013, which has a lifting capacity of 5,000t and a load moment of 354,000tm. The AL.SK cranes are also available in an AL.SK700 configuration, achieving capacities of 8,000t. The cranes can be equipped with a 3,400t capacity heavy duty jib. The AL.SK350 is the world’s largest capacity land based crane. In 2017 ALE used it to perform the world’s heaviest commercial lift using a land based mobile crane, whilst executing an FPSO (Floating Production, Storage and Offloading) integration project in Brazil.

=== Hydro Deck ===
The Hydro Deck is a barge that was launched in 2014 by AG&P ALE Ventures. The system is designed to enable the load-in and load-out of heavy cargo in areas where tidal variations can cause significant delays to projects. Hydro Deck was first used on the Ichtys LNG Project in Darwin, Northern Territory, Australia.
