= Testing, inspection and certification =

Auditing and inspection service

The testing, inspection and certification (TIC) sector consists of conformity assessment bodies who provide services ranging from auditing and inspection, to testing, verification, quality assurance and certification. The sector consists of both in-house and outsourced services.

== Definition ==
The International Organization for Standardization and the International Electrotechnical Commission, international standard-setting bodies composed of representatives from various national standards organizations, define the different testing, inspection and certification services in the international standard ISO 17000 series which includes ISO/IEC 17000:2020 conformity assessment -- vocabulary and general principles.

The process of conformity assessment demonstrates whether a product, service, process, claim, system or person meets the relevant requirements.

- Testing: determination of one or more characteristics of an object of conformity assessment, according to a procedure.
- Inspection: examination of a product design, product, process or installation and determination of its conformity with specific requirements or, on the basis of professional judgement, with general requirements.
- Certification: third-party attestation related to products, processes, systems or persons.

== History ==
The history of testing, inspection and certification services spans back several centuries. In the late 19th century, following the advent of the Industrial Revolution and the considerable risks involved with high-pressure steam boilers, specialized institutions emerged across Europe which carried out periodical inspections of such vessels to assess their overall condition as a precautionary measure to avoid large and often deadly damages. Likewise, several of today's leading TIC companies started as classification societies in the 18th and 19th century to provide information to shipping underwriters on the condition of ships and equipment.

As a result of globalization, supply chains are becoming increasingly more complex. Outsourcing and rising end user quality expectations have resulted in a higher demand for independent TIC services. Businesses are aiming to ensure that products, infrastructures and processes meet the required standards and regulations in terms of quality, health and safety, environmental protection and social responsibility, reducing the risk of failure, accidents and disruption. This includes such services as the testing and inspection of bulk carriers and their cargos possibly carrying commodities such as petroleum, grains or livestock.

Independent TIC companies also play a key role in aiding governments fulfill their mandate in protecting consumers against hazardous products. In the European Union, for example, under the "new approach" directives, certain product categories require assessment by accredited independent TIC companies, known as notified bodies. In the United States, the Consumer Product Safety Improvement Act of 2008 stipulates that third-party testing and certification of certain products is mandatory prior to being placed on the market.

== See also ==
- ISO/IEC 17025
- Product certification
- Sustainability certification
- Type approval
