= Nicolas Tractomas =

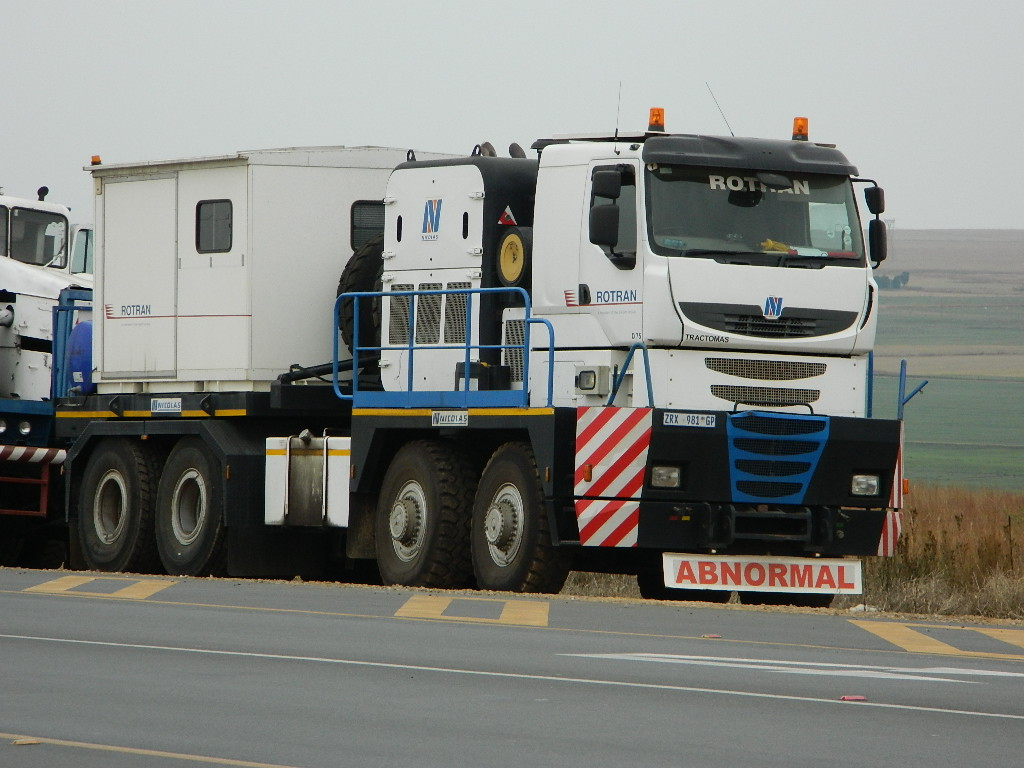
- Nicolas Tractomas, operating in South Africa.

Overview
- Type: Truck
- Manufacturer: Nicolas Industrie
- Production: 1979–2016

Body and chassis
- Class: Ballast Trator
- Body style: COE
- Doors: 2 (excluding life cab)

Powertrain
- Engine: Cummins, Caterpillar, General Motors, MAN, Mercedes-Benz OM
- Electric motor: Diesel
- Capacity: 1,000 ton
- Power output: 1000hp
- Transmission: Allison, Clark, Renk, ZF, Dana
- Hybrid drivetrain: 6x4 – 6x6 – 8x8 – 10x10

Dimensions
- Wheelbase: 1,750 mm
- Length: 10,870 mm
- Width: 3,480 mm
- Height: 4,180 mm (excluding ROPS)
- Curb weight: 36,000 kg

Nicolas Tractomas is a heavy-duty built-to-order ballast tractor specifically to tow hydraulic modular trailers and road trains used for movement of oversize loads manufactured by French manufacturer Nicolas Industrie based in Auxerre. The tractor was bespoke build with preferred engine, gearbox, drivetrain and ballast with a Renault Kerax cabin. The production of the tractor began in 1979 and lasted till 2016. The TR1010 D100 model of the tractor was awarded the Guinness World Record in 2015 for the largest road truck in the world, weighing 71 tons. Nicolas Industrie is a subsidiary of Transporter Industry International (Tii) a Heilbronn-based logistics solution company specializing in trailers, Self-propelled modular transporters, heavy haulers and hydraulic modular trailers. Tii acquired Nicolas Industrie in 1995. Tii has Scheuerle, Kamag, Tiiger with Nicolas under its wing.

== History ==
In the 1970s, traditional tractor manufacturers made lower capacity tractors which ranged between 150 and 250 hp, but heavy haulage operators were in need of more power to move heavy loads with ease. Many operators turned to Nicolas with their tractor requirements, as they were already providing heavy-duty trailer solutions to the market. By 1979 Nicolas developed their first two units of Tractomas tractors which were PH640 OM 6x4 and PH 5030 GM 8x8 which were delivered to China and Tunisia respectively.

The very first units of Tractomas had cabins from willeme and Berliet trucks and engines from Mercedes with 6x6 and 8x8 configuration with ZF gearbox supported by soma axles putting out 415 hp with towing capacity of 200 tons. Later Berliet was acquired by Citroën and later merged with Saviem to form Renault Trucks that's the reason all the Tractomas tractors have Renault kerax cabin. Later in the 1980s, Saudi Arabia army ordered for Tractomas tractors for application of tank transporter with a lowboy trailer and fifth wheel. Through 1980 to 2000 nicolas received orders from all around the world, mainly from Compagnie des phosphates de Gafsa and some Chinese companies. In 2004 a South African haulage company Rotran placed order for Tractomas tractors and received tractors till 2008 these were the units with 750 engines from various manufactures and 8x8 and 10x10 configuration. These were the units which broke the world record for largest road going tractors in 2015.

In 2013 Nicolas delivered new generation tractors to LCR group based in Australia with 1000 hp caterpillar engine and 8x8 configuration for the application of roadtrain in mining sector which had an overall capacity of approximately 550 tons. Nicolas showcased last generation Tractomas tractors at various events from 2013 to 2016 in various countries. In 2016 Toll logistics received possession of the last generation Tractomas tractors for the roadtrain application, these last units were powered with 1150 hp 32ltr engines and were accompanied by a power booster dolly to increase power. In the history of Nicolas, They produced approximately 300 units of Tractomas.

== Name Code ==
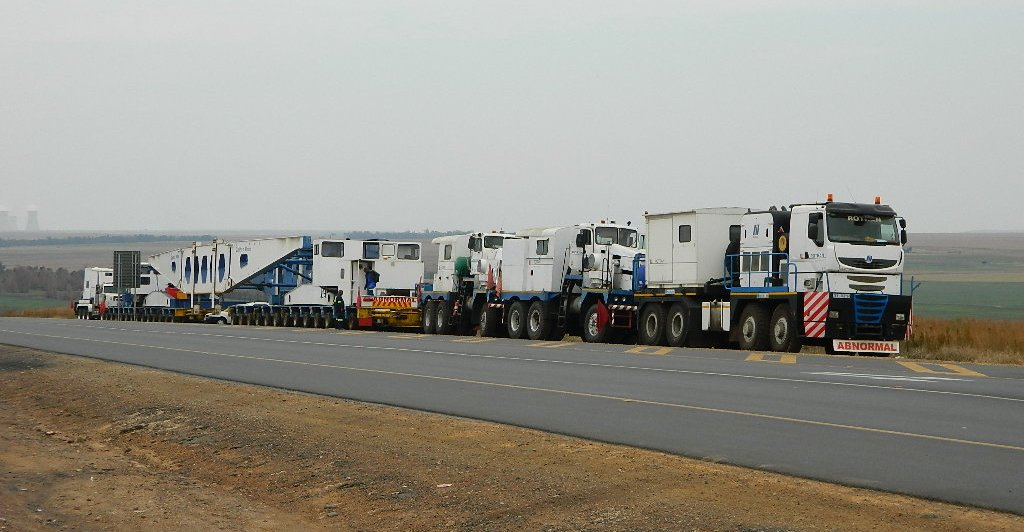
Tractomas Tractor with pacific tractors with girder frame HMT configuration.

Nicolas named their units as per their configuration of engine, gearbox, drivetrain and size, these specifications were alphabetically coded.

- Variation:

A – long hood versions, offered in a joint venture with UK manufacturer Unipower

B – 3 m wide version

C – 2.50 m wide for European regulations.

D – 3.30 m wide.

- Engines:

D – Caterpillar

C – Cummins

G – General Motors

M – MAN AG

O – Mercedes-Benz OM.

- Gearboxes:

A – Allison

C – Clark

R – Renk

Z – ZF

- Axles:

K – Kessler

R – Renault RVI

S – Soma

U – Unipower

A Tractomas name code would look like TR1010 D9RK D100. TR (on road tractor) 1010(10x10 drive) D9(Caterpillar engine, 9 for power rating) R(Renk gearbox) K (Kessler axles) D(3.30 m width) 100 (gross weight).

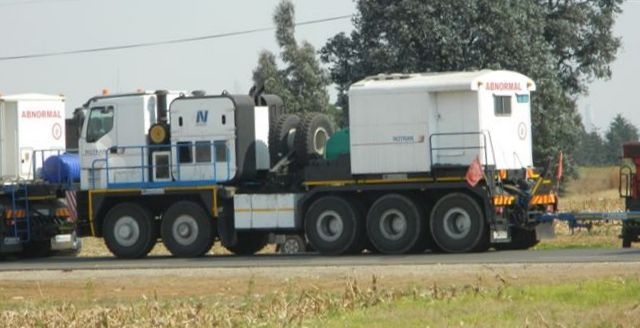
Tractomas TR1010 D100 with life cab.

== See also ==
- Hydraulic modular trailer
- Ballast tractor
- Heavy hauler
- Tractor unit
- Heavy Equipment Transport System
- Tank transporter
