= Rotinoff =

Rotinoff may refer to:

- Alexander Rotinoff (1875-1934), Russian architect
- Rotinoff Motors, British commercial vehicle manufacturer
- Rotinoff Super Atlantic, ballast tractor made by Rotinoff Motors
