= Nicolas Industrie =

French manufacturer of heavy trucks, trailers, and SPMTs

NICOLAS Industrie SAS
- Industry: Logistics
- Founded: 1855 in Auxerre, France.
- Headquarters: Champs-sur-Yonne, France
- Area served: Worldwide
- Products: Trailers; Hydraulic modular trailer SPMT
- Parent: Transporter Industry International
- Website: https://www.nicolas.fr/

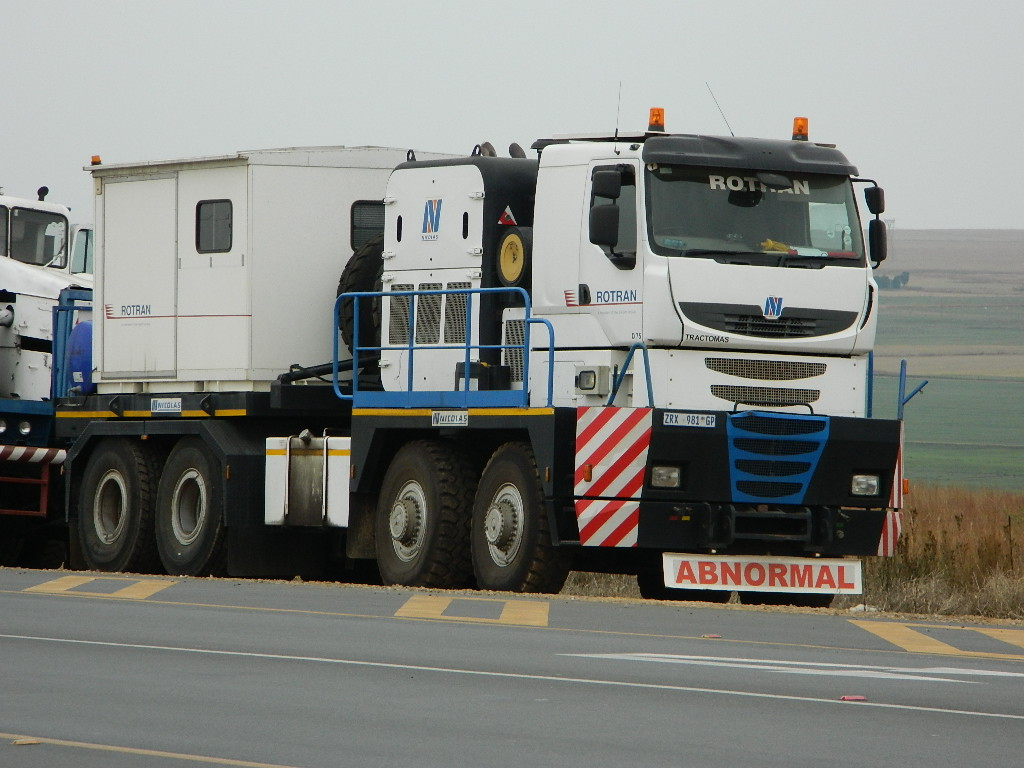
Nicolas Tractomas D75 in South Africa

Nicolas Industrie S.A.S. is a French manufacturer of heavy trucks, trailers, HMT and SPMTs, mostly intended for oversize loads. Nicolas has been located in Champs-sur-Yonne since 1969, which is also when they started to develop vehicles meant particularly for very heavy loads. Their trucks, sold under the Tractomas brand, are built to single order. They most often incorporate Renault cabs and other parts, as well as a number of proprietary parts from manufacturers around the world. The Nicolas Tractomas TR1010 D100 currently holds the record as the world's largest road going truck, weighing in at 71 tonnes.

== History ==
Founded in 1855 as a manufacturer of agricultural trailers, Nicolas developed itself as a heavy haulage trailer specialist in Europe. In 1971 Nicolas delivered its one of first hydraulic modular trailer, consisting of two modules of 10 axles each, 80 wheels in total with a combined payload of 600 tons. In 1973 Nicolas became licensed distributor of York Trailers UK, one of largest trailer manufacturer in the time by this time the company manufactured self powered heavy hauler units which were capable of moving 500 tons with help of a girder frame on multiple axles operated by a crew of three was named the biggest trailer ever built at the time.

In 1979 Nicolas developed Tractomas, a ballast tractor lineup which was specially manufactured for oversize load transportation, powered by 400+ horsepower engines with payload of 200 tonnes and offered with either 6x6 or 8x8 configuration. In 1989 Nicolas manufactured its first SPMT named HY-SPEC (Hydraulic, Self Powered, Electronically Controlled) unit consisted of two modules of 4 and 6 axles configuration with total of 80 wheels with payload of 300 tons with help of a Deutz 450hp engine without employing a ballast tractor.

In 1994 Otto Rettenmaier acquired Nicolas and since then the company has been under the wing of Tii group which also owns Scheuerle Fahrzeugfabrik and Kamag Transporttechnik.

From 190 Employees in 2012, it now has below 40 employees and stopped all production, which made its glory, in order to focus of after sales for Tii group. A serious hit for the local economy since Nicolas was the biggest industry in the French "département Yonne".
