= MOL Trucks =

Belgian vehicle manufacturer

MOL
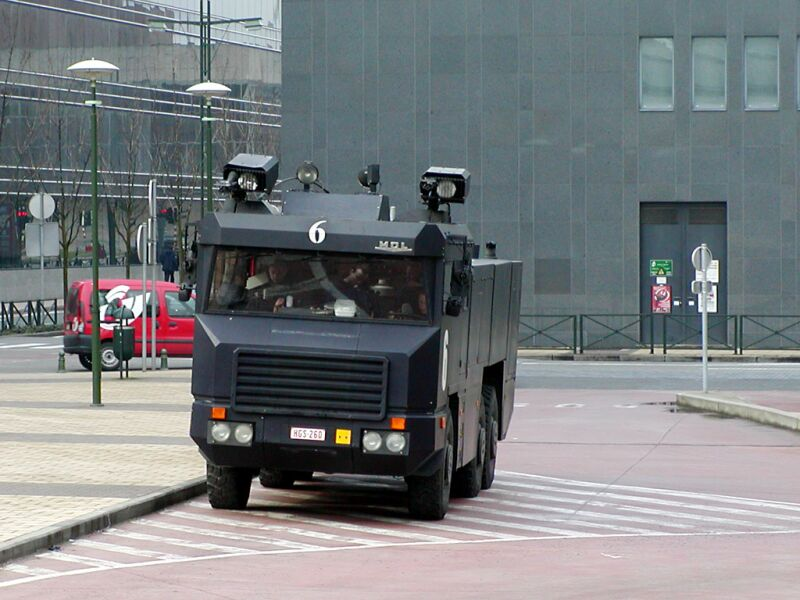
- MOL water canon in Brussels.
- Industry: Automotive
- Founded: 1944
- Founder: Gerard MOL
- Headquarters: Staden, Belgium
- Key people: Martin MOL (COB)
- Products: Trucks; Trailers; Terminal tractor; Waste vehicles; Locomotives
- Brands: MOL; VDK; ITK; INCO-MOL
- Website: https://www.molcy.com/

MOL is a manufacturer of specialist trucks and trailers, based in Hooglede, Belgium. Specializes in manufacturing of trailers, waste vehicles, port equipment, trucks and rail equipments.

== History ==
It was founded in 1944 offered a range of enhanced options and transformations for vintage World War II trucks sourced from the US Army surplus, aimed at optimizing their performance and functionality. By 1952 the company MOL company was formed and started to manufacture vehicles under its name with an annual capacity of 200 vehicles for various applications using engines from different manufacturers like Magirus, Deutz, Cummins and GM supported by transmissions from Spicer, Fuller, Timken and ZF and axles from Timken and Clark.

MOL manufactured trailers in 1960 and by 1970s MOL became specialist in trailer and special vehicle for heavy-duty jobs. In 1971 MOL developed its Oilfield truck with a 6x6 configuration powered by a Deutz F6L producing 170 bhp supported by a ZF six-speed gearbox powering Clark axels. The same year, the showcased a drop deck low loader trailer with 45 ton payload featuring detachable gooseneck and hydraulically powered ramps. MOL also developed off-road vehicles in 4x4 and 6x6 configurations for the Middle East for geophysical operations with capabilities to operate on difficult trains in harsh weather conditions, these vehicles were also displayed at Earls Court Show.

In 1979 MOL bought the rights to Willème TG truck designs, and some MOL ballast tractors continued to be based on these trucks in 8x8 configurations powered by Cummins with towing capacity of 300 to 500 tons for some years, after Willème went bankrupt. MOL continues to export heavy oilfield trucks.

MOL also developed shunter and tugs its FM250 4x4 model shunter is offered in a 4x4 configuration powered by a Mercedes-Benz OM Engine supported with a ZF gearbox and Kessler axles. This model is designed for Roll-on/roll-off operations at the cargo ports.

== Products ==
=== TB 800 ===
Started as a prototype by KFM (Kaiserslauterner Fahrzeugund Maschinenbau AG) a Swiss based firm in 1980 the prototype was named TB600 Desert Lion the completed prototype was showcased at Frankfurt Truck Show in September 1984, the company ran into financial problem, so the project was adopted by (BREC) Belgian Railway Equipment Company which also ran into problems later BREC collaborated with MOL to complete the project. BREC and MOL started to develop TB800, an upgraded version of KFM TB600 powered by a MVWM V12 engine with output of 816 hp the payload of the tractor was 61 ton but was able to tow two times of it. In 1997 EL-Amana an Algeria based oversize load transport company ordered received its first TB800 unit. EL-Amana used TB600 and TB800 in semi truck and ballast tractor configuration with hydraulic modular trailer.

=== HF7566 ===
In 2014 Algerian National Drilling Company ENAFOR ordered MOL for 55 units of HF7566 oilfield tractors all in 6x6 configurations with payload of 110 ton powered by a Cummins x series engine producing 600 hp supported by a 4700 Allison 6 speed transmission these tractors were supplied with suitable trailers of 40 ft length. The tractor trailers were designed to be a tractor trailer combination to work in 50 degree Celsius Algerian deserts. ENAFOR also had ten units of HF5066, which brings the total to 65 number of MOL tractors.

=== HF5066 ===
In 2018 MOL CY delivered custom build ballast tractors to CLP Power Hong Kong Limited in Hong Kong named HF5066 with 6x6 configuration powered by a Cummins ISX15 producing 550 hp supported by Allison full automatic, 4700 series, 6 speeds transmission with a gross weight of 52 tons including the ballast box. The ballast tractors are capable of towing 400 tons of load with a suitable hydraulic modular trailer, CLP is known to own two number of HF5066 and other ballast tractors.

=== VBMR Griffon ===
In 2022 Nexter and MOL collaborated to assemble the VMR Griffon multirole armoured vehicle which would enter Belgian Army's fleet by 2025 under CaMo (Motorized Capability) program by the Belgian government. The Griffon is an armoured vehicle with 6x6 configuration and crew capacity of 8. The vehicle has been in the service since 2019.

=== RM225/255/285 ===
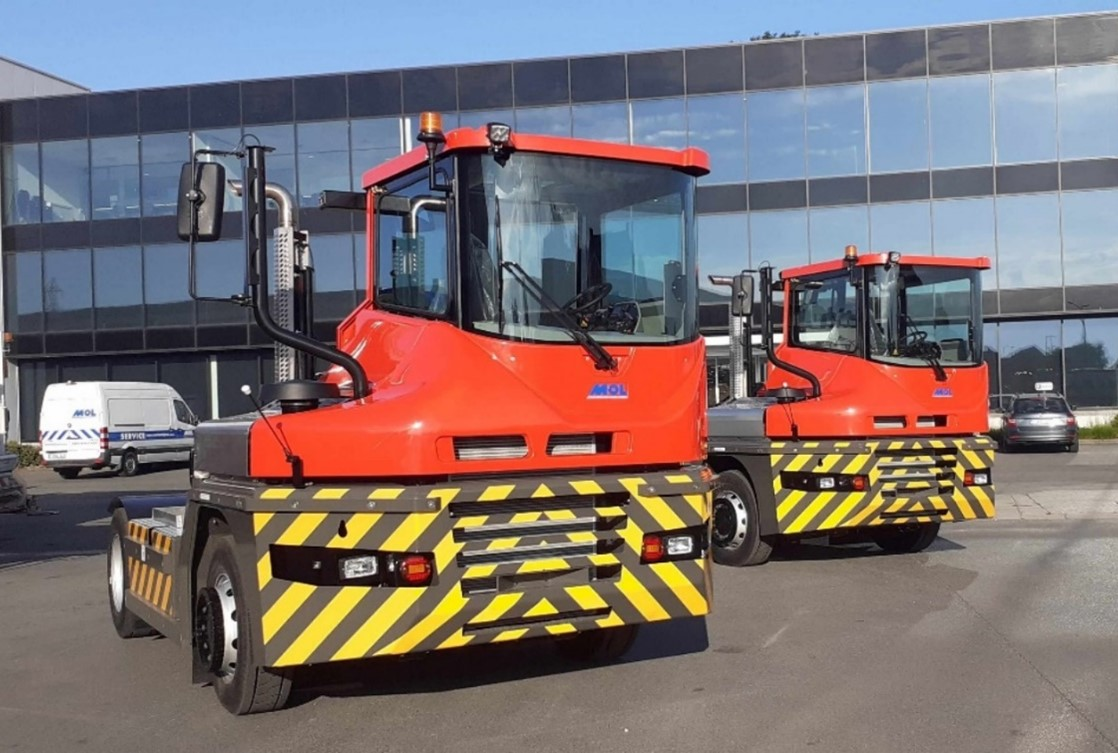
