= Rotinoff Super Atlantic =

Rotinoff Super Atlantic, 6×4
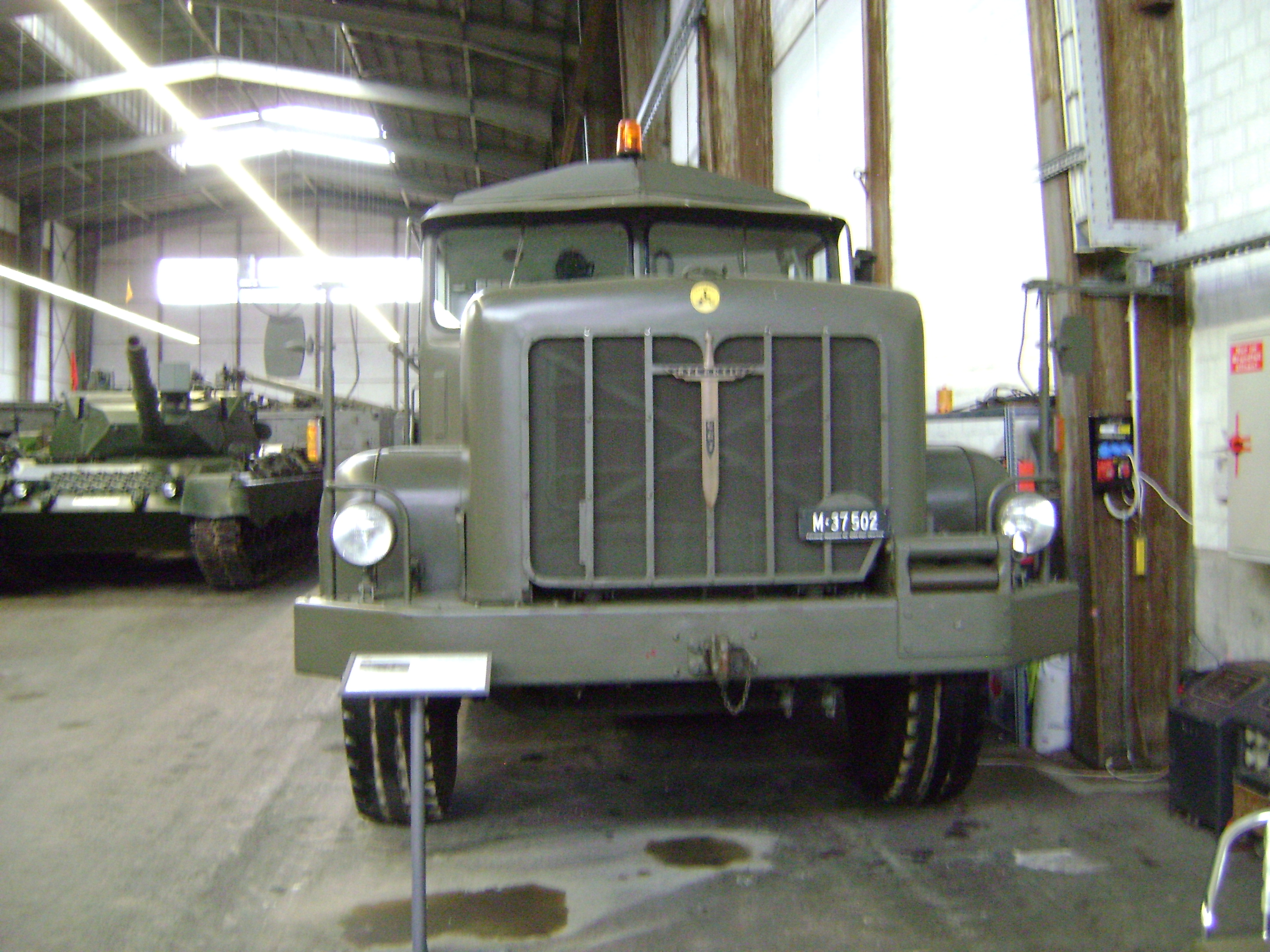
- Swiss Army Rotinoff Super Atlantic
- Place of origin: UK

Service history
- In service: 1958
- Used by: Switzerland

Production history
- Designed: 1958
- Manufacturer: Rotinoff Motors Ltd
- Produced: 1958 - 1962
- No. built: 30-50 Vehicles in total
- Variants: pulling tractor

Specifications
- Mass: 21,750Kg
- Length: 9.33m
- Width: 3m
- Height: 3.4m
- Crew: 3 in the cabin + 2 outside
- Engine: Rolls-Royce C8SFL 8-cylinder inline 16.2 litre 333 bhp
- Suspension: 6×4 wheeled
- Fuel capacity: 2× 290 l
- Operational range: 362km
- Maximum speed: 64 km/h

The Rotinoff Super Atlantic is a 6×4 ballast tractor made by the British company Rotinoff Motors Ltd. The tractor was designed for GCW of 200 tons with the help of a Rolls-Royce six cylinder supercharged engine producing almost 335 bhp with support of six speed main gearbox and a three speed auxiliary box for critical conditions. Kirkstall axles were used due to heavy operations of the tractor which had tire size of 18.00-25 and 14.0024 as optional to bring the vehicle to still it was equipped with compressed air brakes the drum measured 19 by 4 and 19 by 7 front and rear respectively.

The Swiss Army bought ten of them (in Atlantic and Super Atlantic configuration) in 1958, which they used to pull trailers built by Scheuerle with a payload capacity of 50 tons. These were used for transporting the tank Pz 55/57 Centurion tank, thus reaching the total weight of 104 tons.

The Rotinoff Super Atlantic features a fuel capacity of 580 litres in two tanks. In addition to the three places in the cabin, there are also two standing outside for traffic control available.

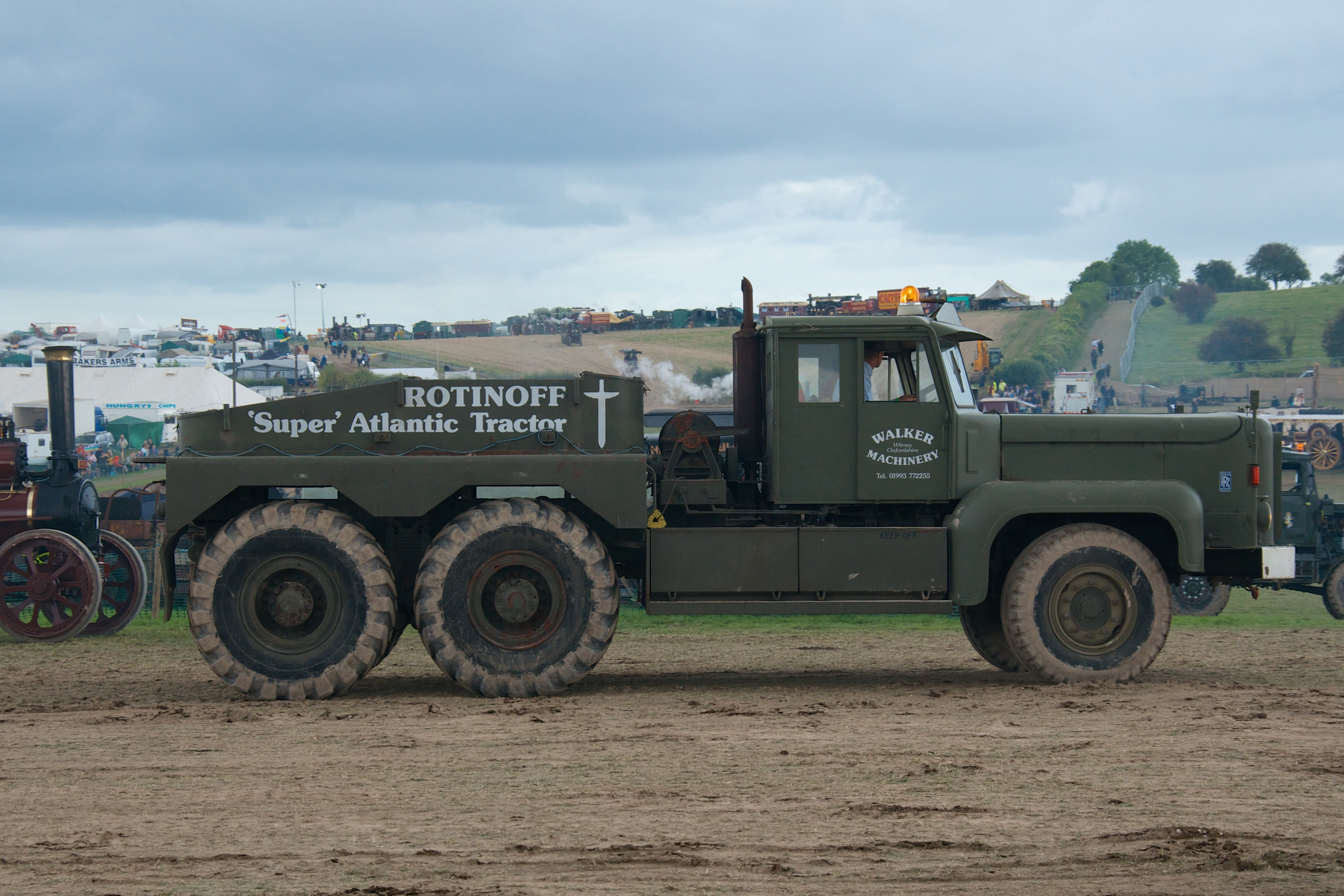

One of these tractors is on display at the Schweizerisches Militärmuseum Full, another in the Swiss Army Historic Foundation in Burgdorf, Switzerland and one is preserved in Oxfordshire, England.
