= Rotinoff Motors =

British commercial vehicle manufacturer

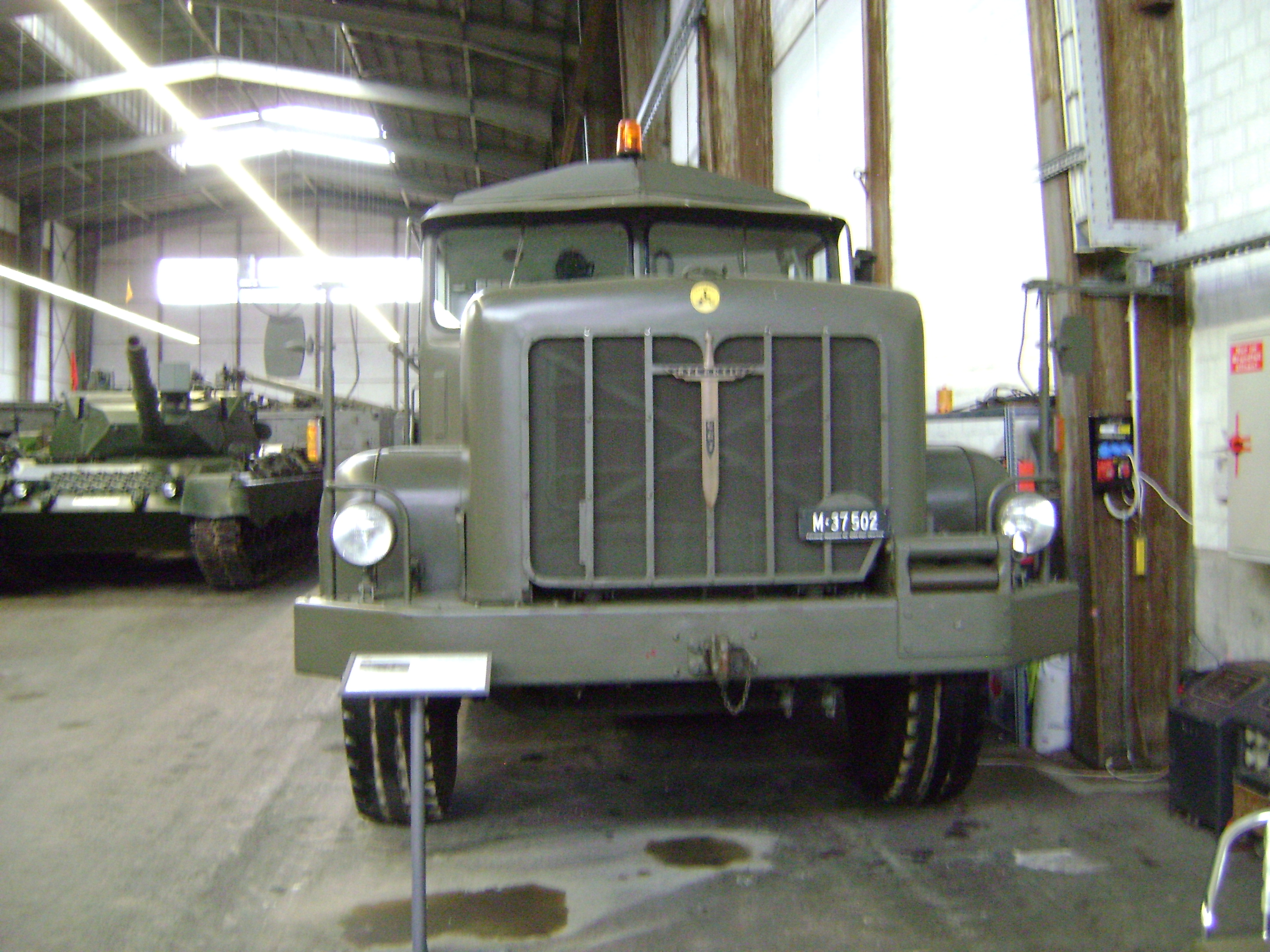
Rotinoff Super Atlantic

Rotinoff Motors Ltd was a British commercial vehicle manufacturer based in Colnbrook, Berkshire, England.

The company was founded in 1952 by the Belarusian émigré George Rotinoff. The Rotinoff company specialized in the production of ballast tractors and heavy transport vehicles. The vehicles of Rotinoff were widely used in Europe as tractors for tank transporters. In the Swiss army, the Rotinoff Atlantic GR 7 was used from 1958 - 1991 by the tank troops to haul Centurion tanks. More Rotinoff transporters were in use as road trains in Australia for the transport of cattle.

George Rotinoff died in 1959, and the brand name Rotinoff was then discontinued. Worldwide there are still Rotinoff vehicles in operation today and they are coveted collectibles.

== Types ==
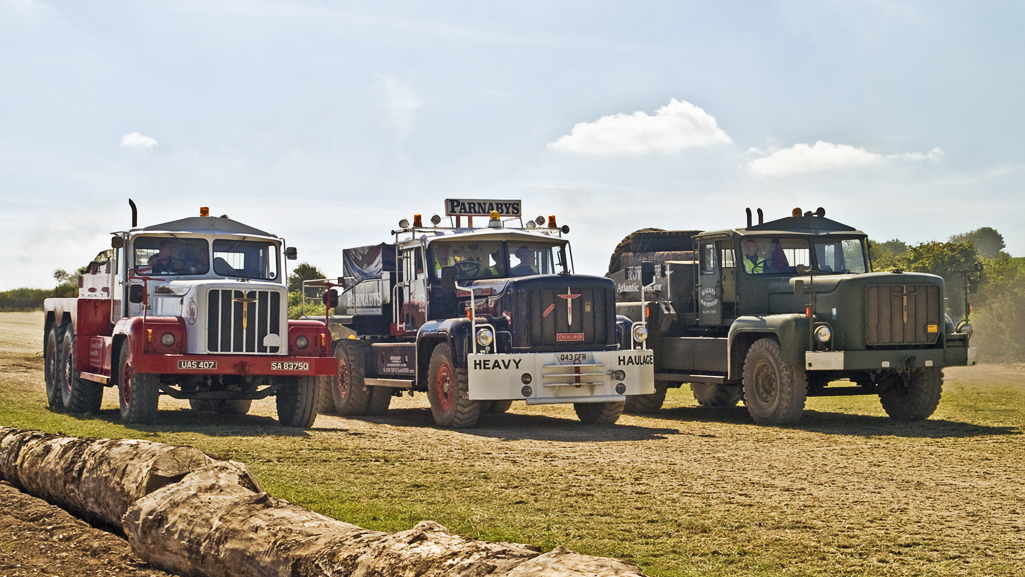
Rotinoff Atlantic ballast tractors

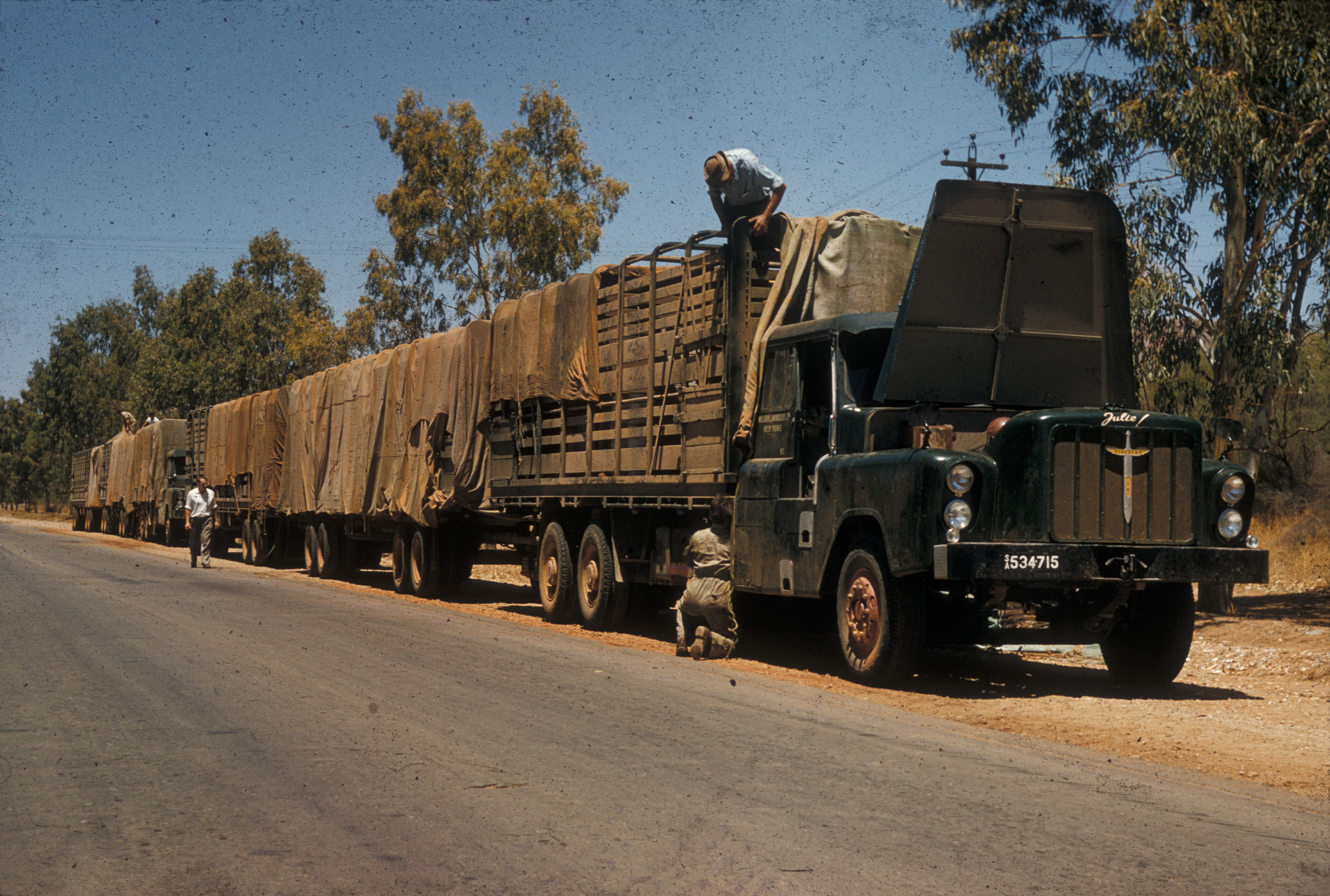
Two Rotinoff trucks being loaded in Alice Springs (Mparntwe) in Australia, October 1957

- Rotinoff Atlantic
- Rotinoff Super Atlantic
- Rotinoff Viscount, cattle transporters (2 examples built)
- Rotinoff Pacific
- Rotinoff Atkinson

== Locations of preserved vehicles ==
- Schweizerisches Militärmuseum Full
- Science Museum, London
- Alice Springs, Northern Territory, Australia

== Sources ==
- Data of the Rotinoff Super Atlantic on militärfahrzeuge.ch (in German)
- Schweizerisches Militärmuseum Full: Werksammlung Mowag GmbH Kreuzlingen (in German)
