= Transporter Industry International =

Specialist for heavy transport vehicles

Transporter Industry International GmbH
- Company type: Private (GmbH)
- Founder: Otto Rettenmaier
- Headquarters: Heilbronn, Germany
- Area served: Worldwide
- Key people: Otto Rettenmaier; Susanne Rettenmaier; Gerald Karch
- Products: Trailer; Hydraulic modular trailer; SPMT
- Brands: Scheuerle; Nicolas; Kamag; Tiiger
- Website: www.tii-group.com

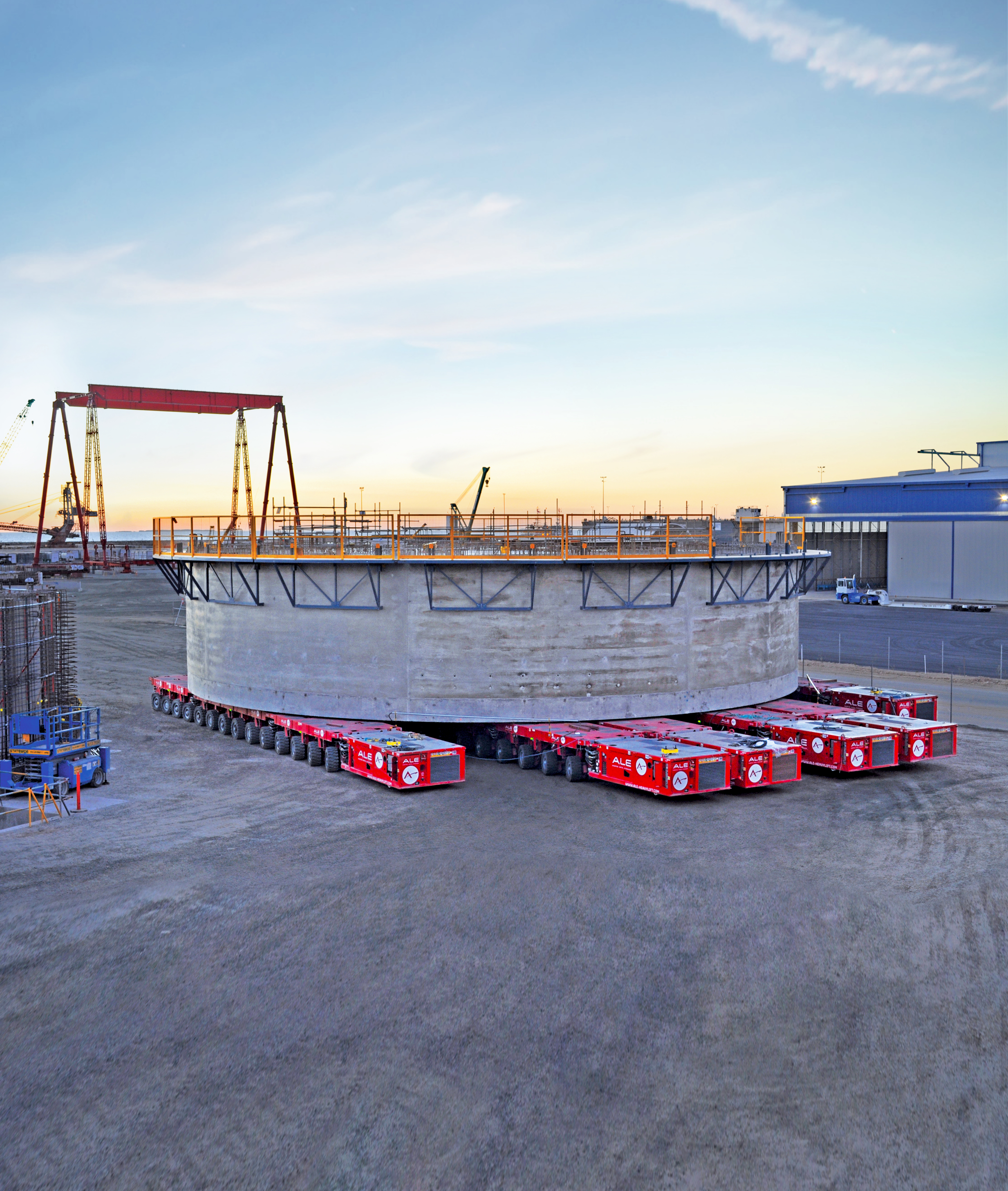
Scheuerle SPMT used by Mammoet to move heavy load.

Transporter Industry International (abbreviated TII, also known as TII Group and KAMAG) is a worldwide operating conglomerate of companies providing heavy-duty transport vehicles and related services. Its history goes back to Otto Rettenmaier's acquisition of Scheuerle Fahrzeugfabrik in 1988. In 1995, Nicolas Industrie joined the group, followed by Kamag Transporttechnik in 2004 and TII India, which is represented by the brand Tiiger, in 2015. Transporter Industry International is the global market leader and known for transports on behalf of NASA, for example.

== History ==
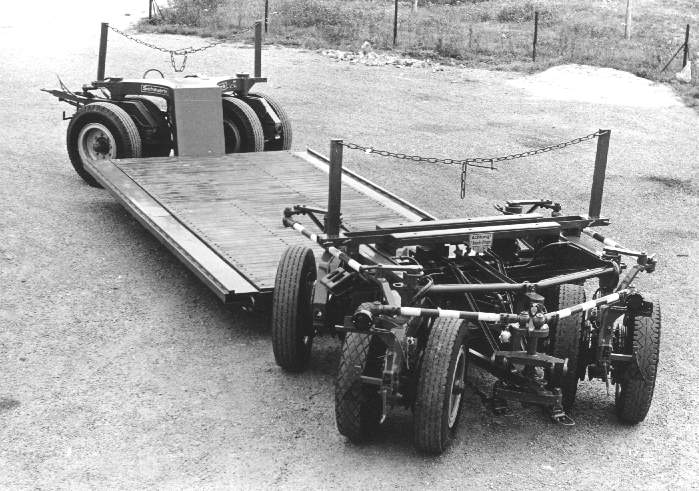
one of the first low-bed trailers of Scheuerle

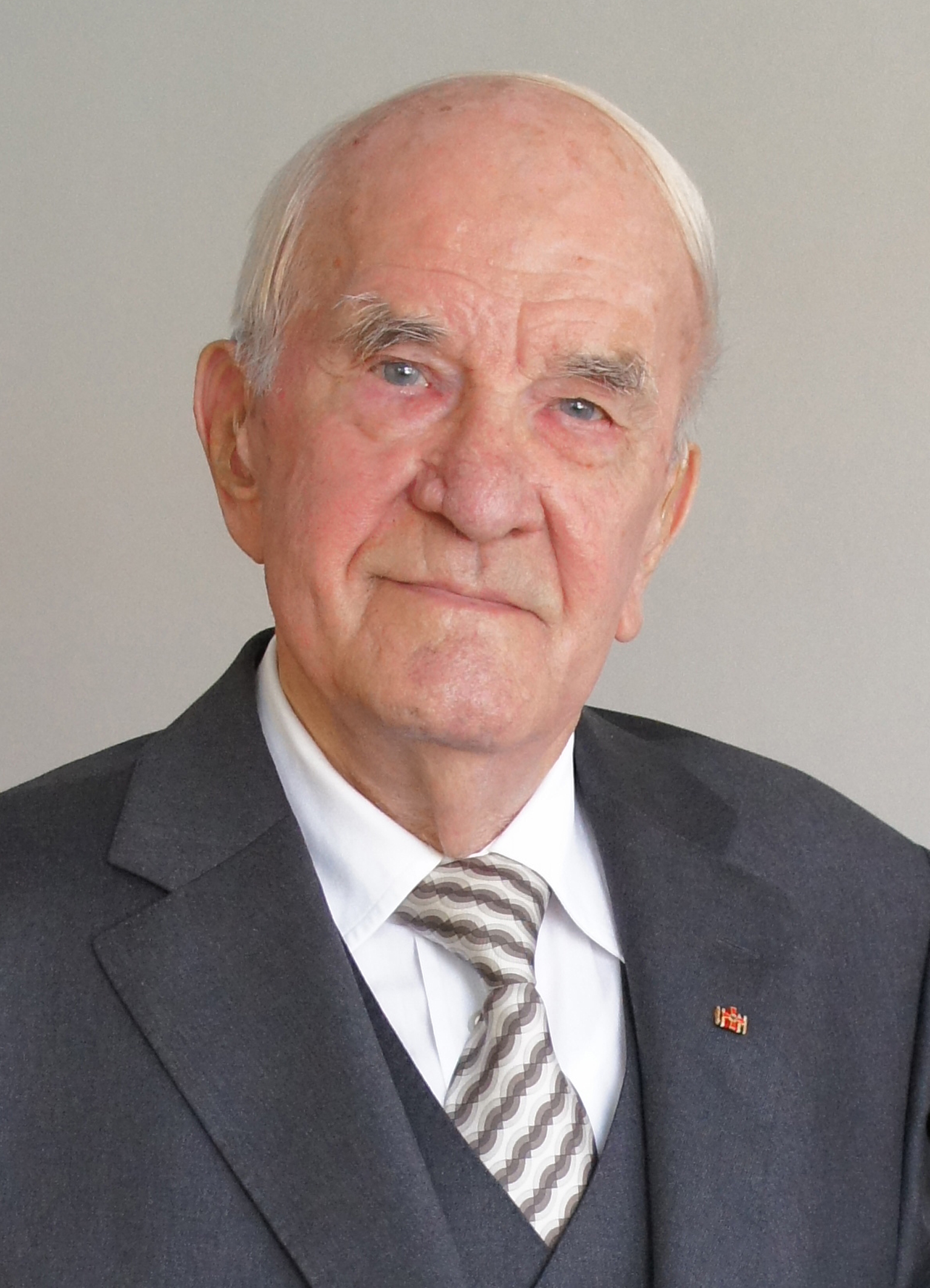
Otto Rettenmaier, founder of Transporter Industry International

In 1988, Otto Rettenmaier acquired one of the oldest and internationally leading manufacturers of heavy-duty vehicles. The German company (Scheuerle Fahrzeugfabrik) was experiencing economic difficulties. Rettenmaier had already been active as an entrepreneur: He expanded his parents' mill business to become the world market leader in the production of wood fibers (cellulose).

After the successful restructuring of Scheuerle Fahrzeugfabrik, Rettenmaier bought the French competitor Nicolas Industrie in 1995, which also produced heavy-duty vehicles. To create the legal and organizational conditions for further growth, a holding company called Transporter Industry International was established. This was also intended to illustrate the global market position. The subsidiaries themselves retained their regional character and continued to operate independently, but cooperated in sales, for example.

In 2004, Rettenmaier was given the opportunity for further expansion. Due to the insolvency of Kögel Fahrzeugwerke, the subsidiary (Kamag Transporttechnik) specialized in smaller industrial vehicles and modular transporters had to be sold. With the takeover and integration into the holding company, Rettenmaier completed the product range of Transporter Industry International.

Scheuerle, Nicolas, and Kamag developed joint products for high demanding projects. All three companies set world records in terms of the loads to be transported and in other areas. In 2015, Transporter Industry International acquired the civilian sector of the Indian trailer manufacturer Tratec, thus securing its first local presence outside Europe, with access to emerging markets in Asia; subsequently, the company was renamed.

== Holding ==
Transporter Industry International (TII) operates as a private limited company (Gesellschaft mit beschränkter Haftung) with its headquarters in Heilbronn, Baden-Württemberg, Germany. It is owned by the Otto-Rettenmaier family and is a globally active manufacturer of heavy duty and special vehicles. TII includes industry specialists, TII SCHEUERLE and TII KAMAG, and has production sites in Germany and India along with a worldwide organisiation of sales and service partners. In addition to the parent company (TII Group), there is a sales division for distribution and customer services (TII Sales) of all divisions, operating as a private limited partnership (Kommanditgesellschaft).

== Divisions ==
=== Scheuerle ===
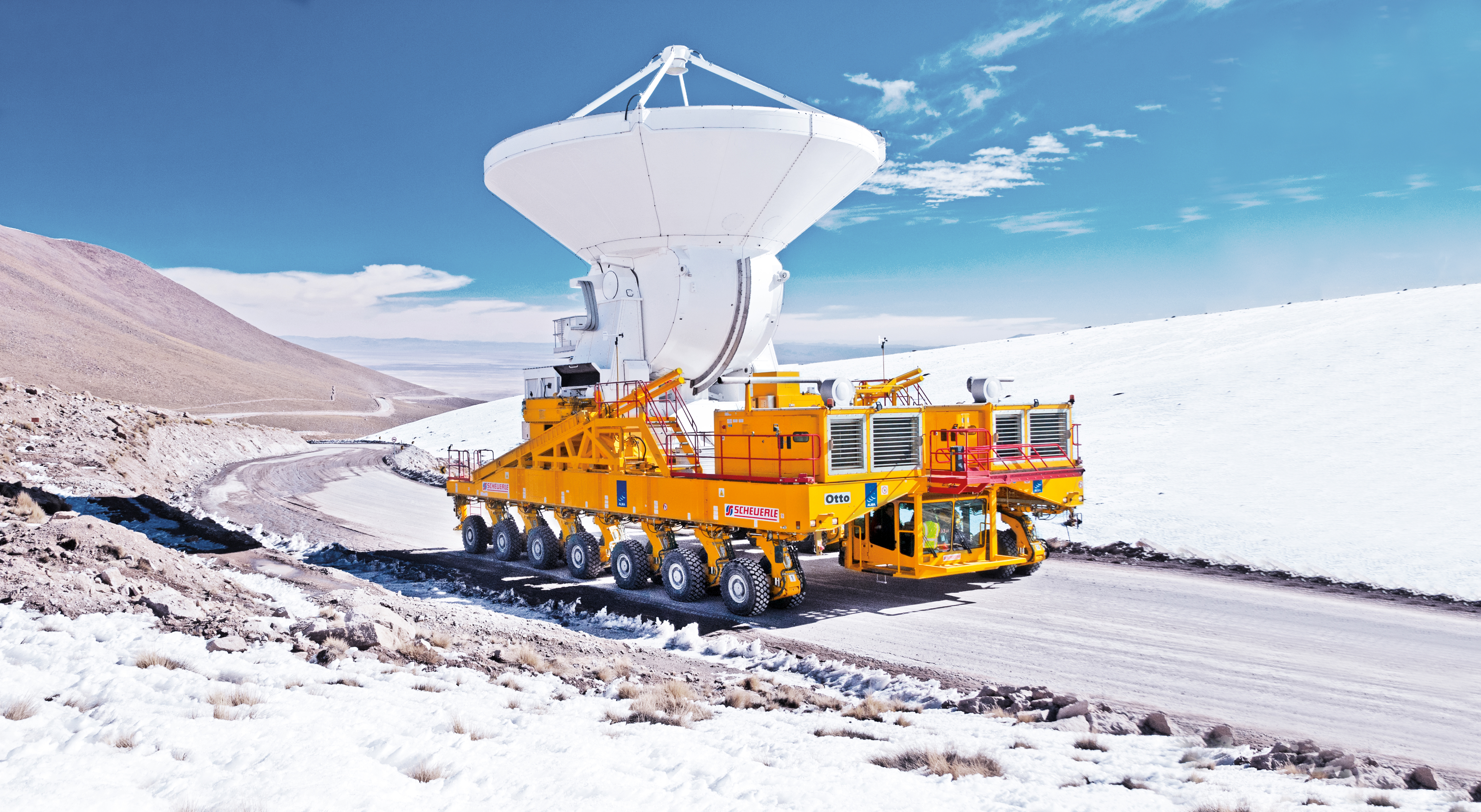
Lore antenna transporter manufactured by Scheuerle

Scheuerle Fahrzeugfabrik was founded in 1869 and is headquartered in Pfedelbach, Baden-Württemberg, Germany. The company invented the modern low-bed trailer concept in 1949. Numerous other innovations followed, for example in the field of hydraulic and electric four-way steering. In 1960, Scheuerle achieved international attention with the relocation of historic Abu Simbel temples in Egypt. Today, the portfolio includes self-propelled modular transporters, modular and compact vehicles for road transportation, as well as power boosters, for example. Besides, there are various services for maintenance and training.

=== Nicolas ===
Nicolas Industrie is headquartered in Champs-sur-Yonne, Auxerre, France. The company was founded in 1855 and therefore has the longest history of all Transporter Industry International subsidiaries. Its first patent covers wheel motors and dates back to 1884. Nicolas developed the modern heavy-duty transporters with pendulum axles. Today, the company's product and service range are almost identical to Scheuerle.

=== Kamag ===
Kamag Transporttechnik was founded in 1969 and is headquartered in Ulm, Baden-Württemberg, Germany. Its primary goal was to shift heavy transports to the road. Today, Kamag develops and produces specialized transporters and other modular vehicles for a wide range of applications.

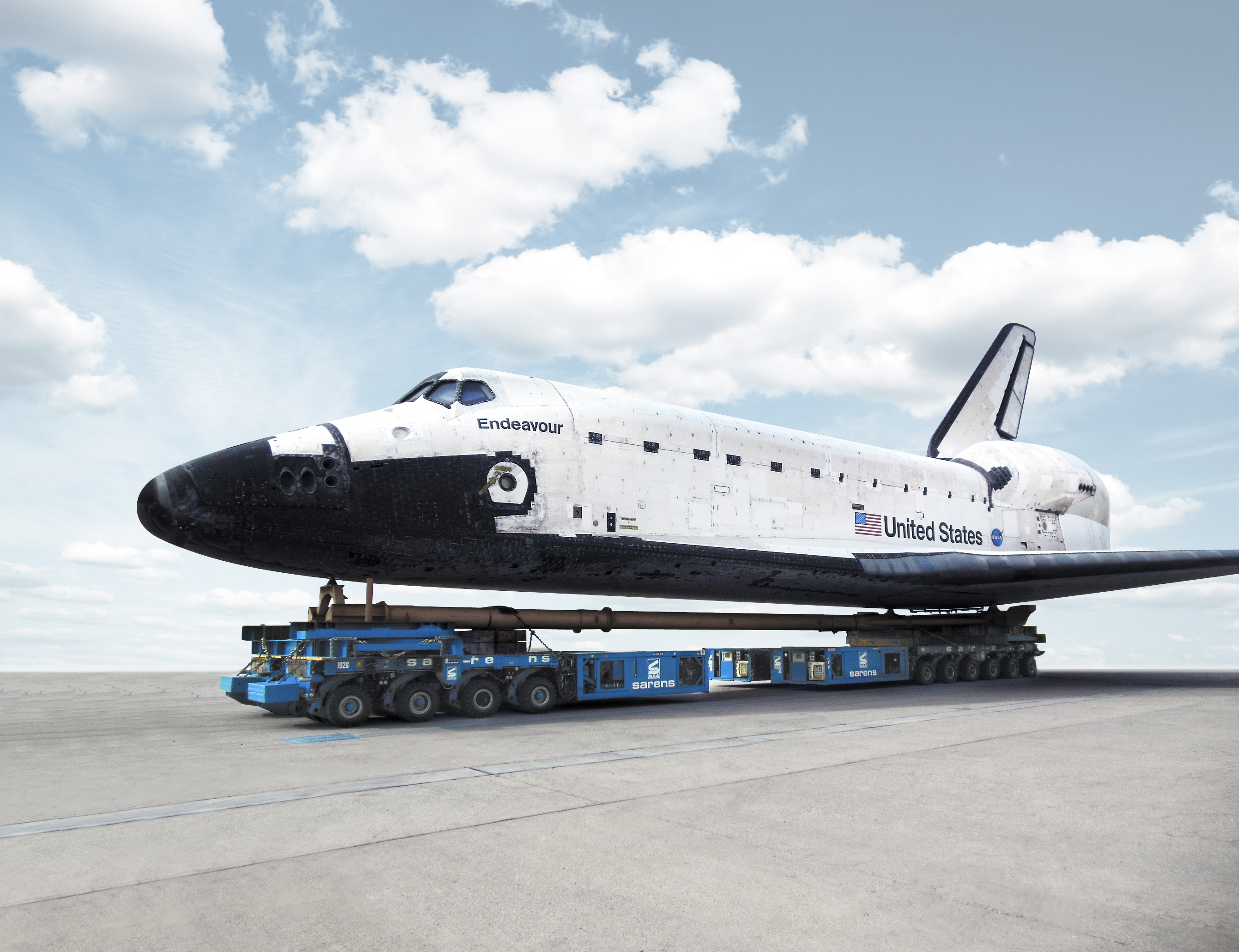
Space Shuttle Endeavour on Kamag transport modules

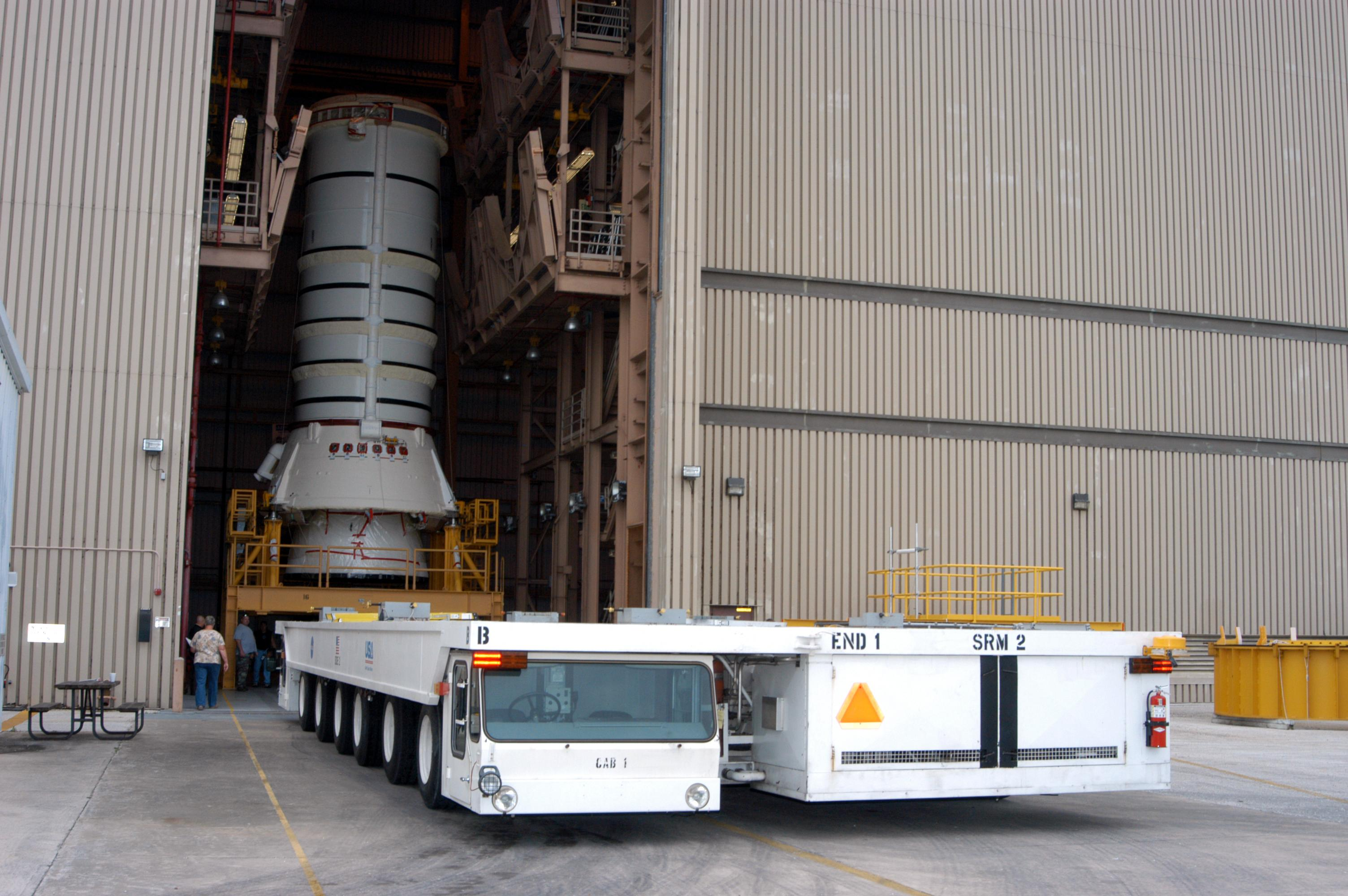
Solid Rocket Motor transporter vehicle manufactured by Kamag

NASA has been a customer of Kamag Transporttechnik since the year 1979. The company provides vehicles to move rockets, boosters, and satellite payloads. The Solid Rocket Motor (SRM) transporter, for example, moved the Space Shuttle segments between refurbishment and storage facilities on the Cape Canaveral Air Force Station and the Vehicle Assembly Building. Payload Canister Transporters (PCT) moved payload canisters between space shuttle payload processing facilities, the vertical processing facility, and the launch pad.

=== Tiiger ===
In 2015 Tii group acquired Tratec's civil operations a trailer manufacturer based in Bawal, India specialist in trailer manufacturing and first Indian hydraulic modular trailer manufacturer catering government and civil sector. Since acquisition, civil business is controlled by Tii India and government business is still owned by Tractec. Tii group formed a new brand Tiiger under which the company offers extendable wind blade trailers and hydraulic modular trailer for transportation of oversize loads. The manufacturing unit of Tiiger is based in Balwal, Haryana in 30,000 sqft. Which would cater India, Africa and South-East Asia.
