= Willème =

French truck manufacturer

- Founded: 1923
- Founder: Louis Willeme
- Defunct: 1970
- Headquarters: Nanterre, France
- Products: Heavy trucks

Willème was a French truck manufacturer, specializing in heavy- and special-duty trucks.

== History ==
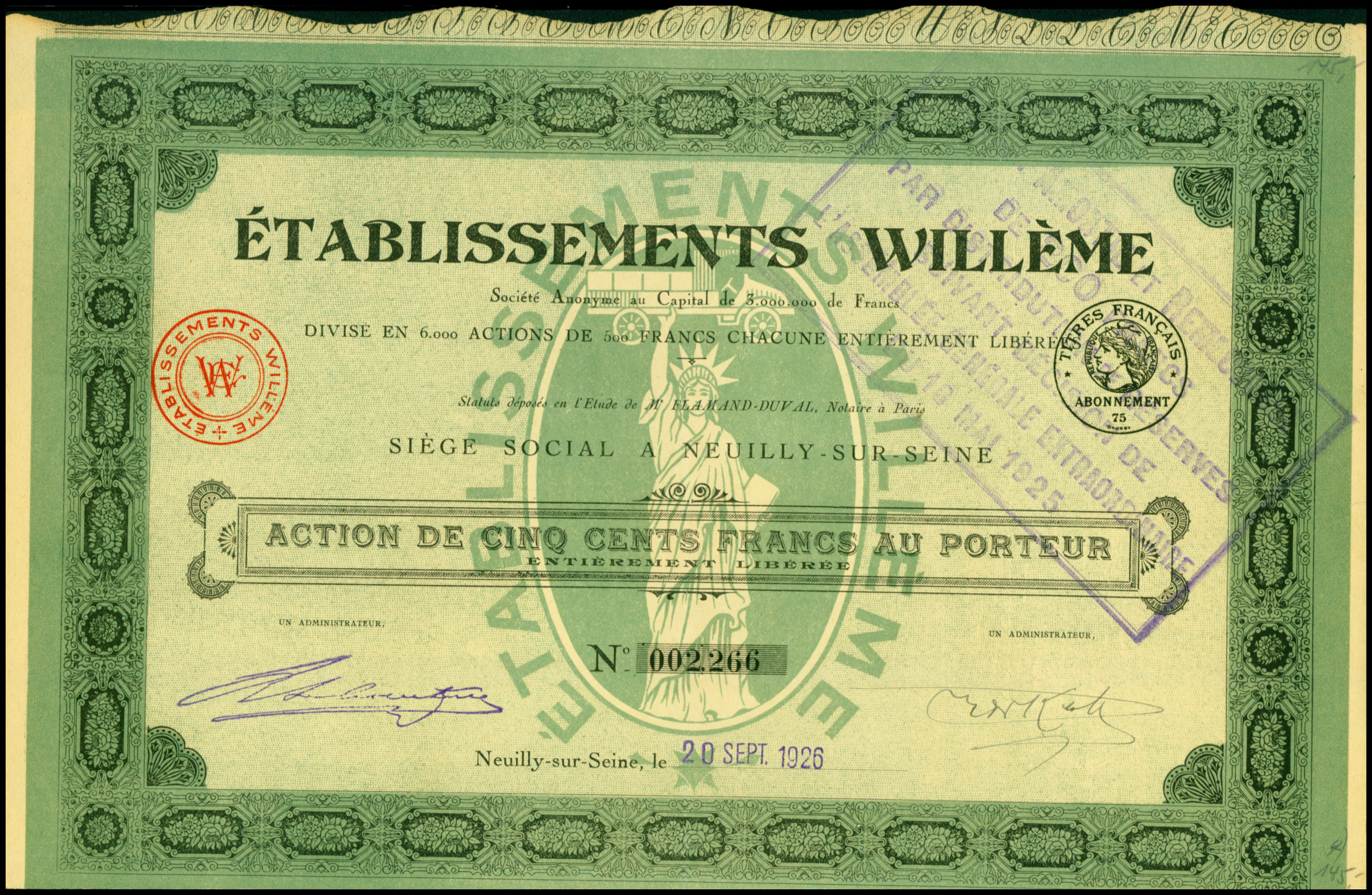
Share of the Établissements Willème S.A., issued 20. September 1926

Willème was founded in 1923 as Ets. Willème S.A. in Nanterre, France by Louis Willème, after working for Automobiles Grégoire. The company built its first tractor truck in 1930; this had a 20-tonne (44,000 lb) GCWR.

In May 1962 A.E.C and Willème signed an agreement in which A.E.C (Associated Equipment Company) will provide engine and components to Willème for its special purpose and heavy-duty truck range the first order was started off with 500 units of A.E.C diesel engines. This agreement also authorized Willème to assemble and distribute A.E.C. medium duty trucks. By the end of 1962 Willème was assembling B.M.C (British Motor Corporation) trucks ranging from 1.5 to 7 tons capacity and also assembling A.E.C cargo and passenger vehicles in France alongside their own heavy-duty trucks.

In 1970 Willème started to have difficulties with A.E.C and stopped manufacturing their trucks and attempted a switch to Volvo for sourcing the engines and components. At the 1970 Paris commercial vehicle show Willème showcased their first 6×4 tipper chassis, powered by Volvo's 270 hp (199 kW) engine supported by a Fuller 13-speed gearbox. Willème went bankrupt in 1970 and PRP (Perez et Raimond Paris) took over the company. PRP continued to manufacture heavy-duty trucks like the TG 100, 200, 250, and 300, offering them with Cummins, GM, Caterpillar and Mercedes-Benz engines capable of high payloads.

TG300 was the most powerful truck offered by the company, a ballast tractor promoted as being capable of towing 1000 tonnes with a suitable hydraulic modular trailer. Trobosa, a Spain-based trailer manufacture also developed some TG300 models as it was a leading manufacturer of tank transporter and hydraulic modular trailers. In 1979, Belgium's MOL acquired the design rights of the TG range from PRP and continued to manufacture heavy-duty ballast tractors mostly in 8x8 configurations with Cummins engines, with towing capacity of 300 to 500 tons for oversize load transport applications. In 1980 Creusot-Loire used the TG range of trucks as the basis in developing their T40A military tank transporter, an 8x6 configuration powered by a Detroit Diesel engine supported by a 13-speed Allison transmission.

== Products ==
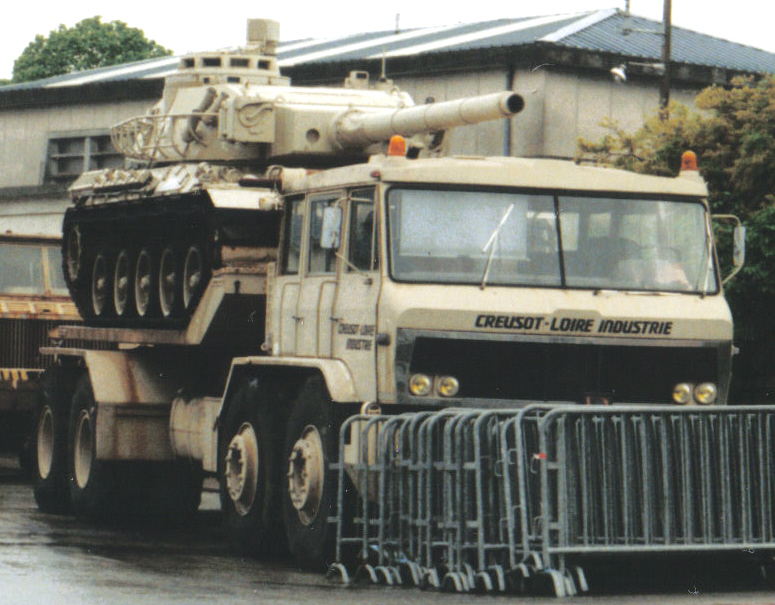
Willème PRP T40 rigid tank transporter at Musée des Blindés, France.

In the post-war years, Willème specialized in large lorries and tractors, and special duty trucks such as heavy haulage ballast tractors.

=== Early models ===
The DW12A was used as a tank transporter by the French army.

=== Post-war trucks: S10, L10, and R15 ===
10- and 15-ton trucks, with Deutz engines, sold between 1945 and 1953.

=== 610 and 615 series ===
Sold 1953–1963.

=== TL and LD series ===
Available with both AEC and Willème engines.

- The AEC-engined 5741-CG was sold as an 8-wheel heavy wrecker.
- Some models, such as the W8SA, were also built as oilfield trucks.
- RD 6x4

=== Willème-PRP ===
- W200, 8x4, 245 tonne gross weight.
- The TG200 was an 8x4 heavy-hauler, capable of handling 200 ton loads.
- TG250: 250 tonnes gross weight
- The TG300 was 8x8 capable of hauling up to 1000 tonnes, powered by a Detroit Diesel V16. Some were built by Trabosa.
