= Ballast tractor =

Heavy-haulage road vehicle

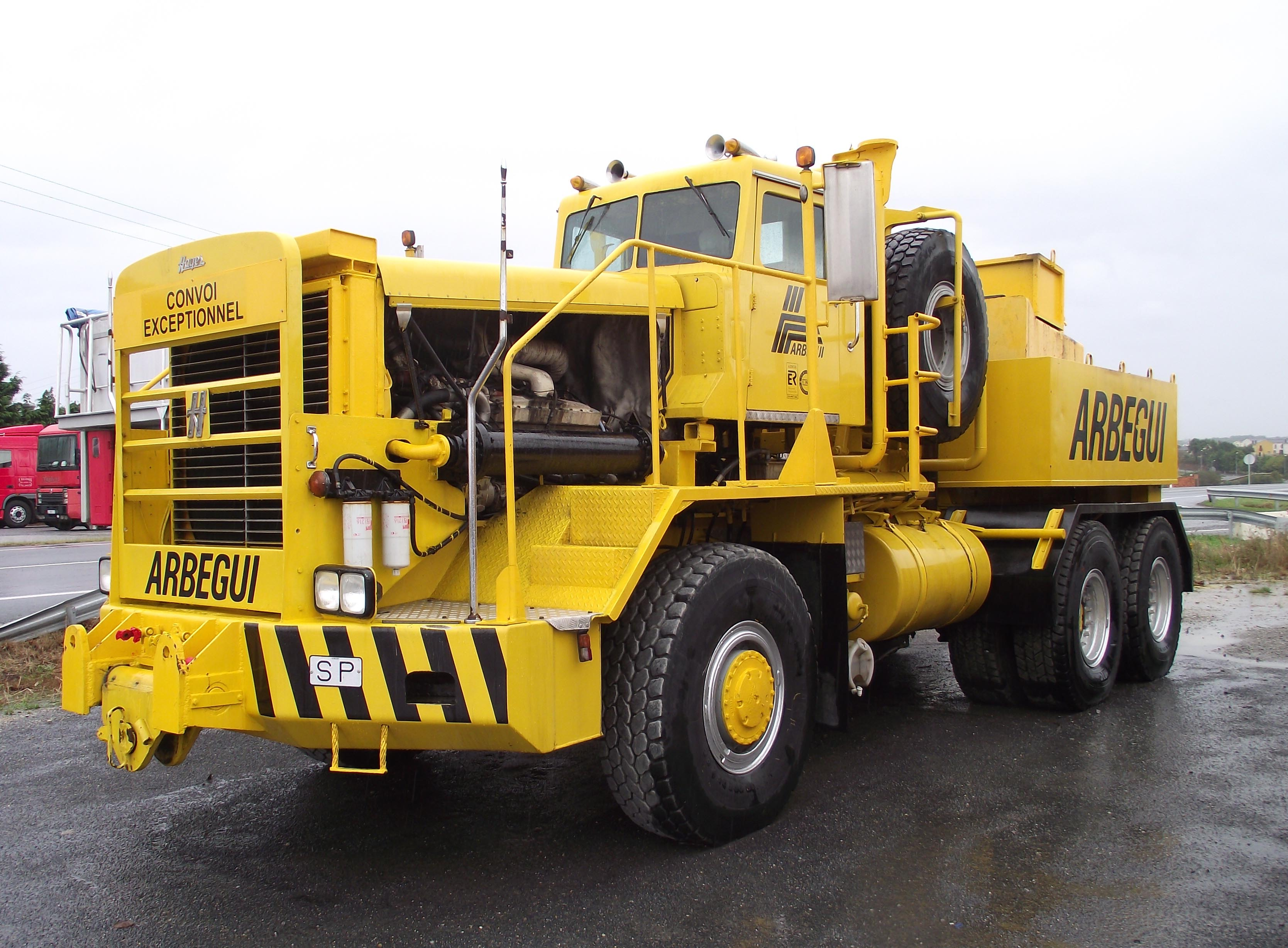
Hayes WHDX 70-170 6×6 tractor

A ballast tractor is a specially weighted tractor unit of a heavy hauler combination. It is designed to utilize a drawbar to pull or push heavy or exceptionally large trailer loads which are loaded in a hydraulic modular trailer. When feasible, lowboy-style semi-trailers are used to minimize the height of a load's center of mass. Typical drivetrains are 6×4 and 6×6, but 8×6 and 8×8 are also available. Typical ballast tractor loads include oil rig modules, bridge sections, buildings, ship sections, and industrial machinery such as generators and turbines.

Only a handful of manufacturers produce dedicated ballast tractors. Extra-heavy-duty chassis versions of mass-production tractor units are fitted with drawbar hitches and a separate ballast box as an alternative. These units are classified as N3 Category of large goods vehicle. Ballast tractors can be traced back to the 1940s when heavy haulers from the UK started employing purpose-built Scammell Showtracs, a short wheelbase 4×2 ballast tractor.

Increasingly, remote-controlled, self-propelled modular transporters (SPMT) are being employed in traditional ballast tractor/trailer roles.

== Etymology ==
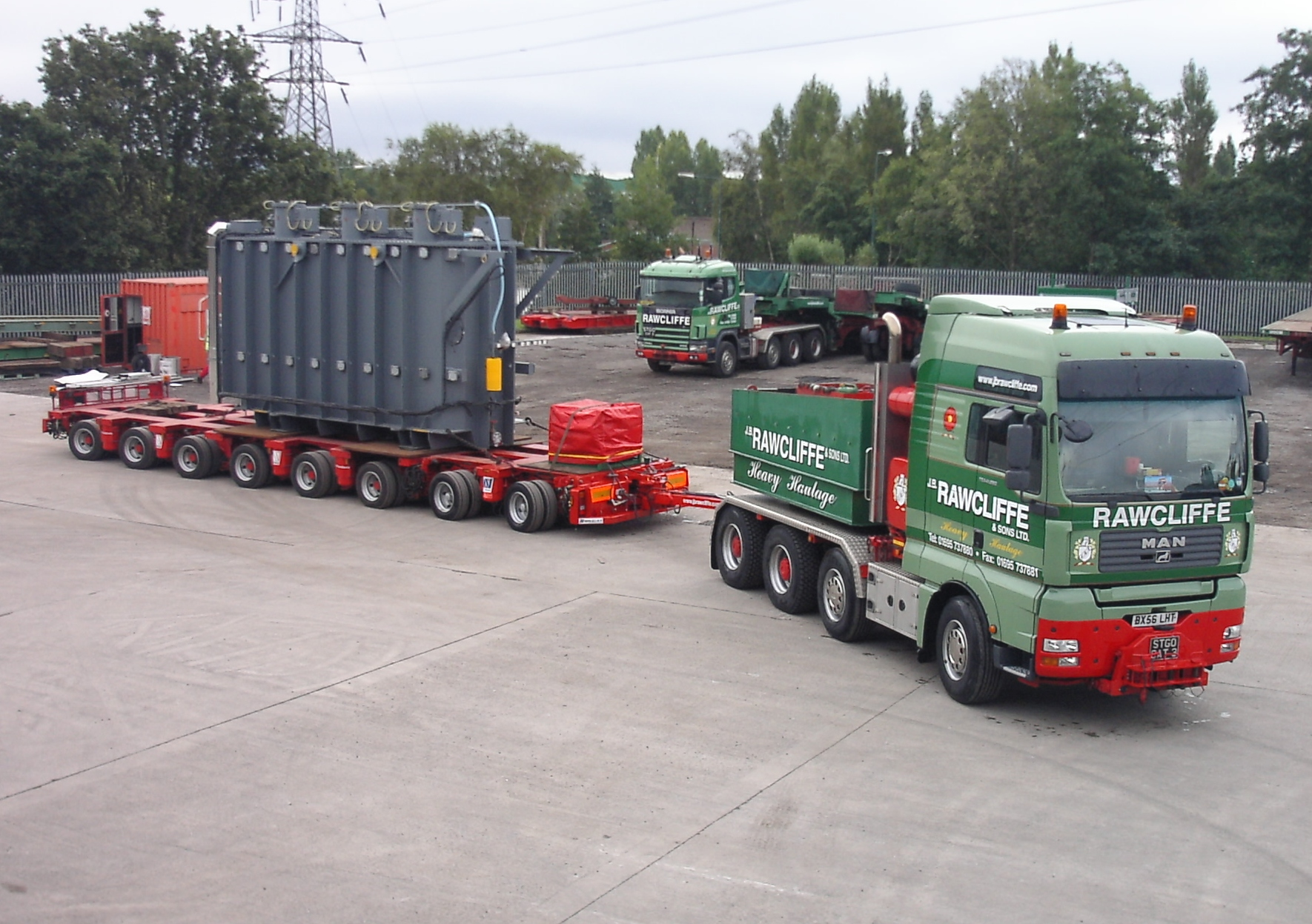
MAN ballast tractor hooked via drawbar to 92,000 kg (203,000 lb) transformer on Nicolas modular axles

The ballast tractor's name derives from the nautical term “sailing ballast” describing heavy material added to a vessel to improve stability. For a ballast tractor, ballast is added over the driving wheels to maximize traction. The additional weight increases the friction between the tyres and the road surface, allowing the tractor to overcome the inertia and friction of moving a heavy trailed load. Without it, there would be unproductive wheelspin.

== Description ==
With a semi-trailer, ballast is added in the form of the weight of the attached trailer pressing down upon the tractor's fifth wheel. Since the load is separate from a ballast tractor, it provides no ballast: the drawbar only transmits a horizontal force.

High inertia is encountered when starting to move a heavy load. To overcome this, ballast tractors tend to have high-powered, low geared engines that provide substantial torque, especially at low speeds. Additionally, ballast tractors are often fitted with heavy-duty hub reduction axles, a combination resulting in exceptionally low maximum speeds.

A strong chassis is required to both support the extra ballast weight and pulling forces transmitted by the drawbar. A reinforced chassis also allows multiple tractors to be coupled together to maximize power and traction. Heavy-duty versions of commercial tractor units may be fitted with a ballast box and suitable draw gear, or a ballast tractor may be purpose-built. Ballast is placed above the driving axle, or spread out over multiple driving axles to maximize traction on each and evenly distribute its load. Conversion from a regular tractor to a ballast tractor may require some modifications like chassis alteration, extra axle, larger tires, ballast box, and a heavy-duty gearbox so that it can handle the extra weight. The heavy-duty tractors which are usually converted into ballast tractors have 6x4, 8x6 axle configuration, hub reduction, better suspension and a powerful engine ranging from 300 to 1000 hp.

A purpose built ballast tractor tends to be the heaviest class of on-road trucks. In some cases, its kerb weight can be greater than their axle configuration's legal Gross Vehicle Weight (GVW) permits, requiring special permission to use public roads. Some nations have categorized these tractors in a different category than conventional tractors because of higher GVW permits and HMT configuration.

Typical ballast tractor configurations employ an independent drawbar trailer, hydraulic modular trailer, or dolly trailer. An advantage of using ballast tractors is the ability to push-steer a trailer around a corner. A girder trailer, for example, is double-articulated, so the front tractor can pull the load around a corner while the rear tractor pushes it through, thereby making the load more manoeuvrable than a simple towing configuration. Use of a following tractor also can increase control and brake force descending an incline.

== Equipment ==
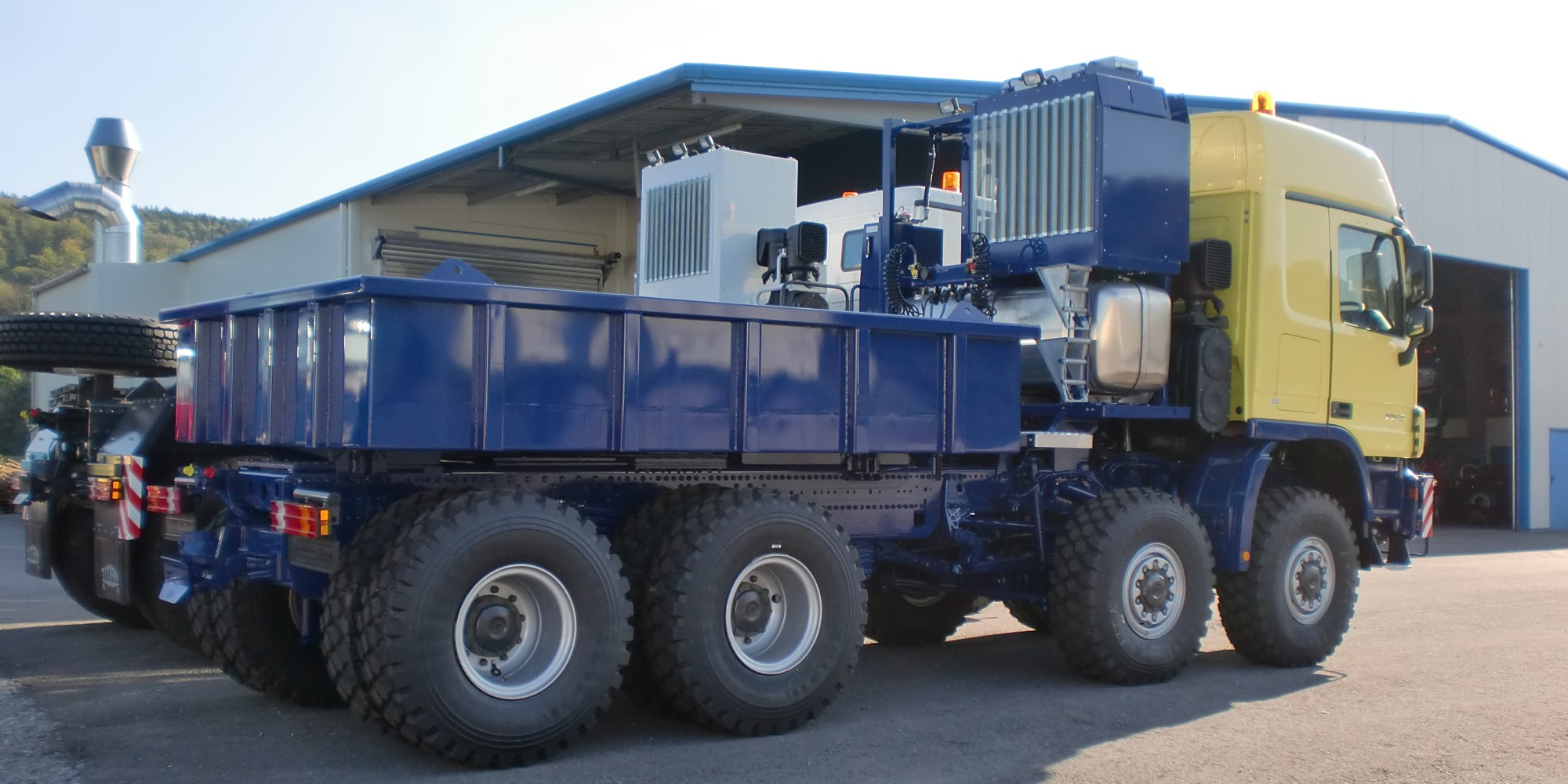
Titan Spezialfahrzeugbau GmbH ballast tractors with Mercedes-Benz Actros cabs

=== Ballast box ===
The ballast box is a metal box installed on the rear chassis of the tractor instead of the fifth wheel coupling. Earlier heavy haulers unmounted the fifth wheel and used merely a piece or two of heavy rocks, stones or concrete blocks which weighted enough to avoid wheel spin, later builders and heavy haulers developed metal boxes of different designs to match the tractor layout. These boxes were filled with concrete or steel to increase the weight of the tractor. The problem with ballast tractors was the weight of ballast itself weighted over 10, 20 or even 40 tons in some scenarios. Other designs also included sleeping cabins in the ballast for the drivers and the crew for longer journeys and harsh weather conditions, This made the height of the tractors increase significantly, these units are still used today in the gulf area due to extreme heat. Some units have factory fitted ballast box with appropriate weight to meet with the regional guidelines, these tractors units do not have fifth wheel and drive out from the factory with a ballast box. Heavy haul operators convert heavy-duty tractors to ballast tractors to pull hydraulic modular trailers with ballast box, axles addition, cabin modification and tow hitch coupling sometimes it takes thousands of parts and period of months for the conversion.

New age power boosters which are external engine an accessory of hydraulic modular trailer can also be mounted on the tractor chassis to act as a ballast, saving a lot of space on the trailer itself for the loads and most important avoid application of extra tractors. Mammoet and Scheuerle (Member of the TII Group) have proved this configuration in 2019 on a difficult terrain in Norway. Almost all HMT manufacturers have their own variant of power booster.

=== Drawbar coupling ===
Drawbar coupling is a special tow hitch mounted on the front end or rear end of the tractor, sometimes both, it connects the HMT to the ballast tractor. Earlier coupling consisted of in house made metal hitch which had loops to lock drawbar eyes with a pin. Later fifth wheel manufacturers like Jost Rockinger and Ringfeder developed heavy-duty drawbar couplings with a 50 mm loop, drawbars and drawbar eyes which were built with higher quality and standards this increase the safety significantly. These couplings can be mounted on both ends of the tractor for push or pull applications. Some manufacturers also provide tractors with drawbar coupling fitted from the factory.

== Manufacturers ==
Only a handful of manufacturers produce dedicated ballast tractors. Most high-volume manufacturers offer heavy-duty chassis versions of certain tractor units, which enable a ballast box to be fitted. In Europe, manufacturers tend to send some of their products to another company (owned by the parent) to be converted into a special heavy-duty version.

Belarus

- Volat

Belgium

- MOL

Canada

- Hayes
- Pacific

Czech Republic

- Tatra

France

- Nicolas Tractomas 8×8 and 10×10 ultra-heavy-duty tractors
- PRP
- Willème

Germany

- Tadano Faun GmbH
- MAN / ÖAF
- Mercedes-Benz (Titan)

India

- Volvo Trucks India
- Scania India

Italy

- Astra-SIVI (Iveco)

Netherlands

- DAF (GINAF)

Russia (formerly Soviet Union)

- MAZ
- NAMI

Spain

- TBO Trabosa
- TMU

Switzerland

- NAW

UK

- AEC
- Atkinson Vehicles
- ERF
- Foden Trucks
- Rotinoff Motors – 35 heavy haulage tractors were built by the company between 1952 and 1959, of which 11 are known to survive.
- Scammell – Many early examples, now used and seen as showman's vehicles, originally served with the army.
- Thornycroft -such as Thornycroft Antar
- Unipower

USA

- Diamond T - Ex-army Diamond T M20 tank transports were popular post World War II with heavy hauliers in the UK.
- Kenworth
- Mack
- White
- Oshkosh Corporation

== Operators ==
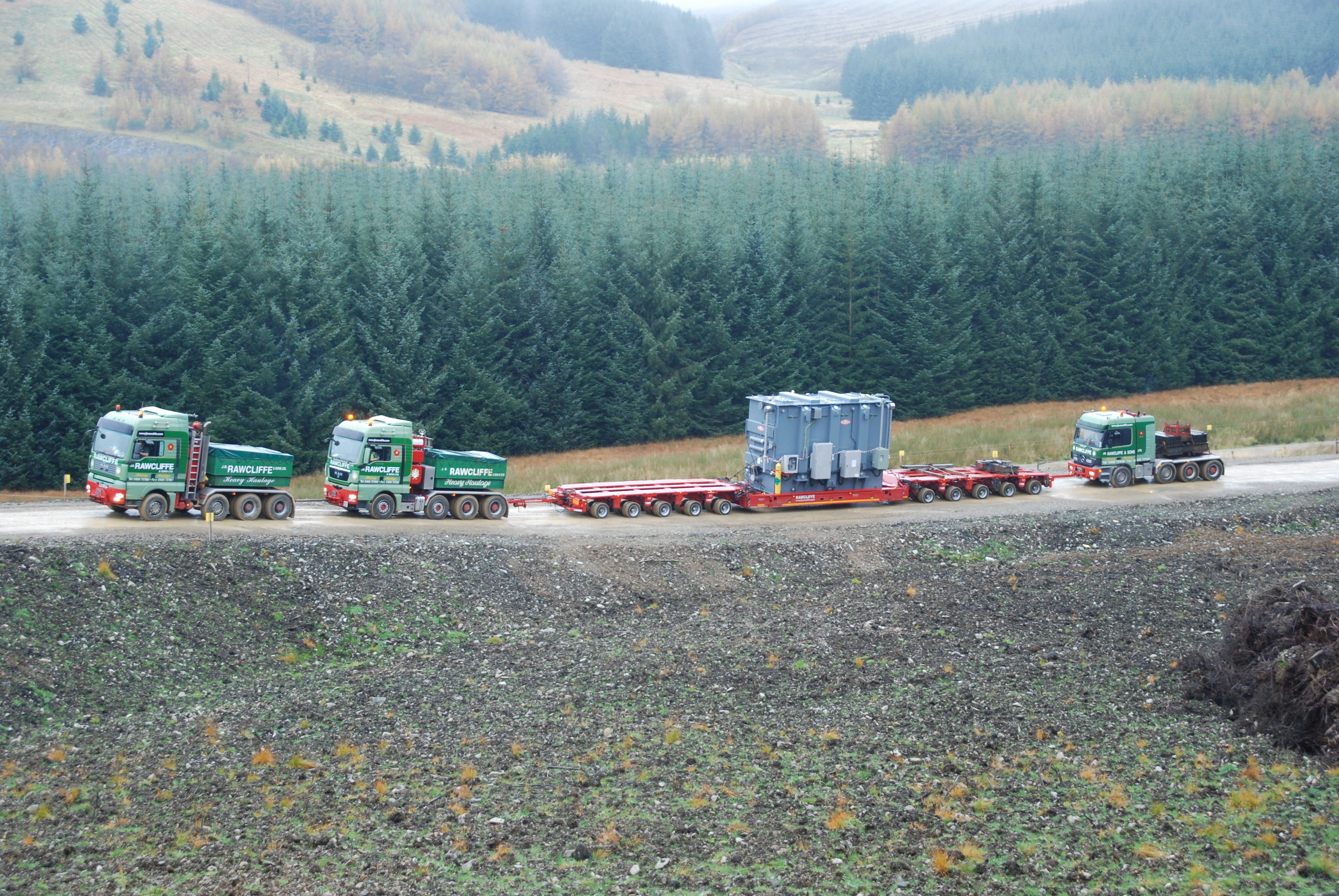
Three ballast tractors from JB Rawcliffe & Sons (two MAN pulling and one Mercedes pushing) with 100,000 kg (220,000 lb) transformer on Nicolas modular-5 Greiner bed 5-axle trailer en route to a wind farm substation

Most heavy haulage and heavy lift engineering firms employ heavy duty tractor-unit models that can accommodate a ballast box. Countries where modernization is taking place, such as regions of the Middle East and South Africa and Asia, operate larger number of ballast tractors due to the greater frequency of heavy loads (such as power station components) and infrastructure projects.

Apart from being used by fairgrounds as a direct replacement for the steam-powered showman's engine, specialist moving and haulage companies use ballast tractors. These include:

- Alstom
- Mammoet
- Pickfords
- Sarens
- ALE
- Lampson International
- CLP Group
- Omega Morgan
- Defence Research and Development Organisation

== Gallery ==
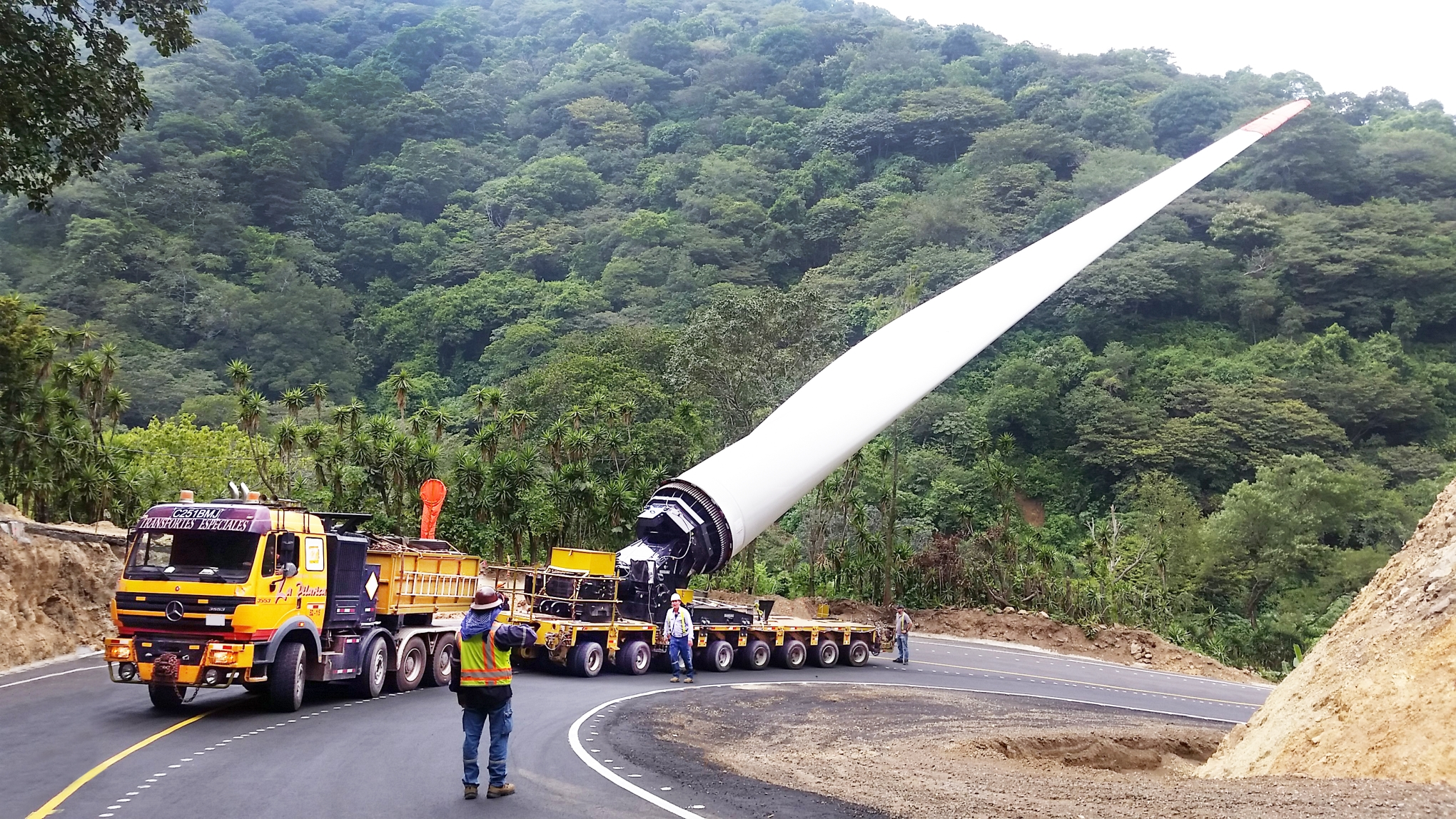
Mercedes-Benz SK Ballast Tractor pulling Goldhofer hydraulic modular trailer with FTV 300 blade lifter carrying a Wind turbine blade.

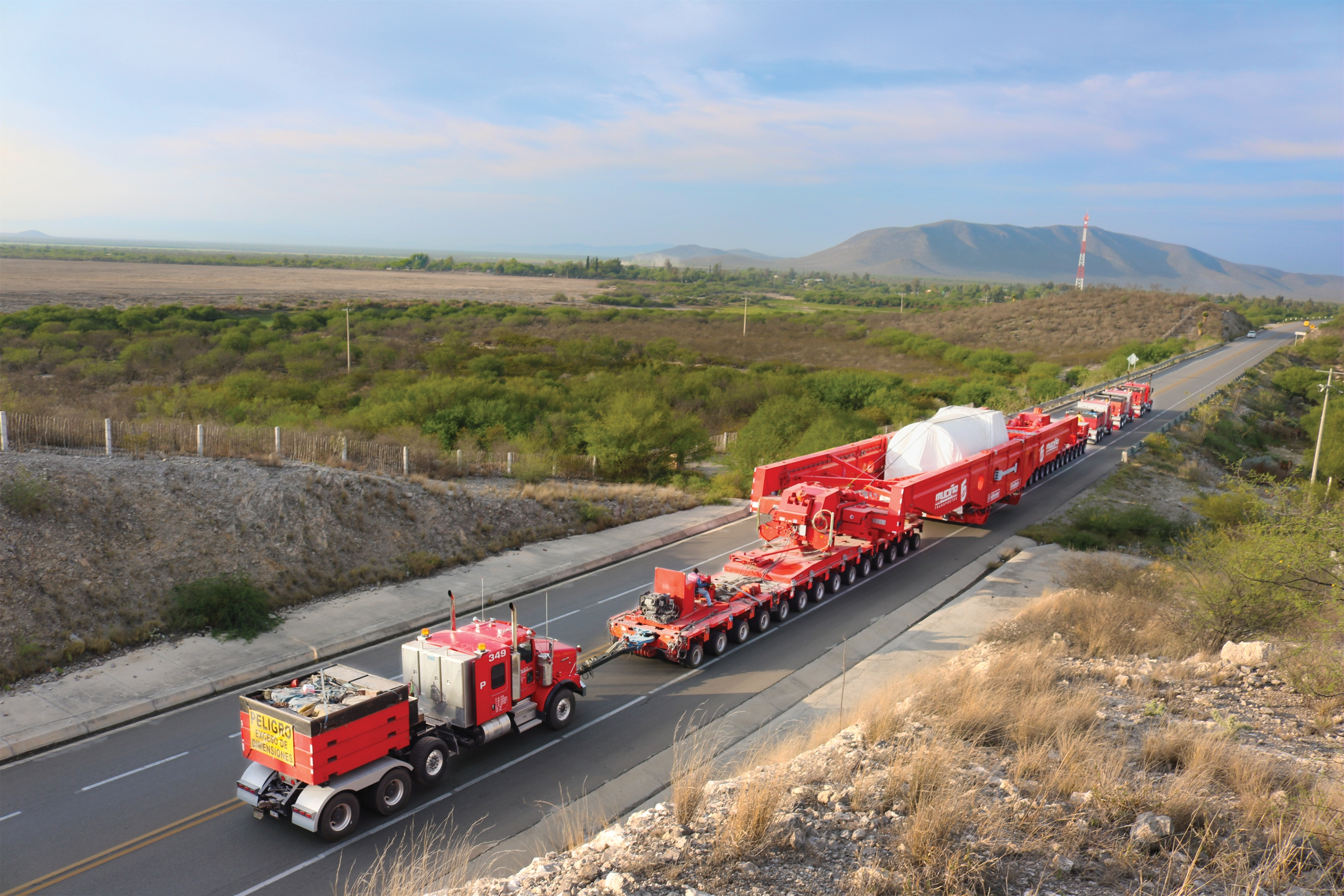
Ballast Tractor Pushing Goldhofer hydraulic modular trailer with Faktor 5 girder bridge.

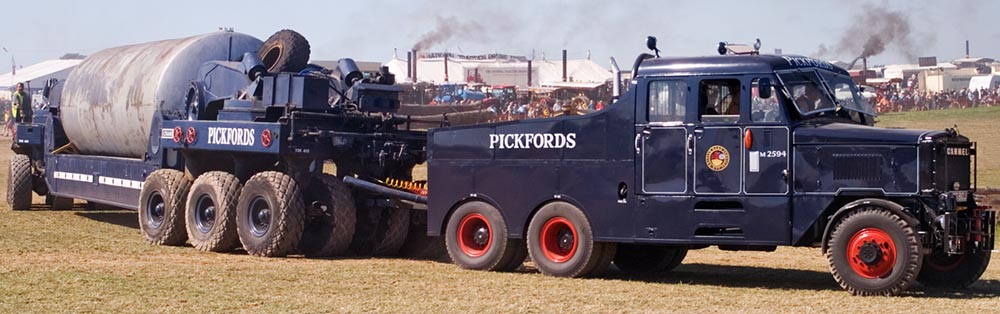
Scammell Contractor ballast tractor pulling specialist trailer at a fair

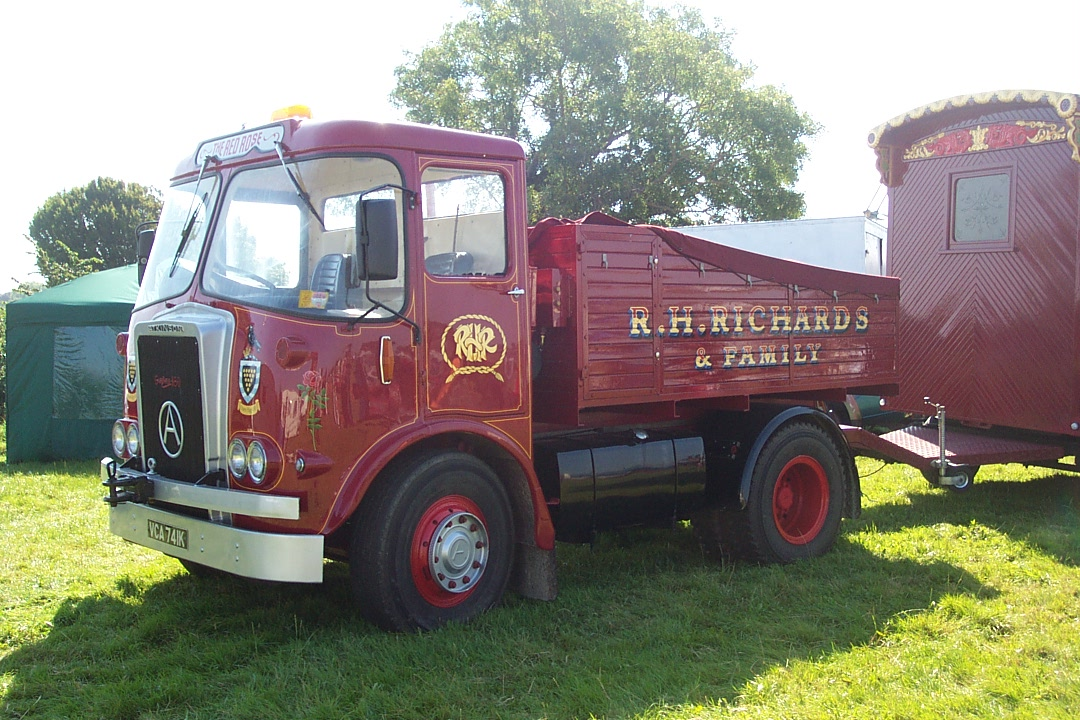
Atkinson ballast tractor

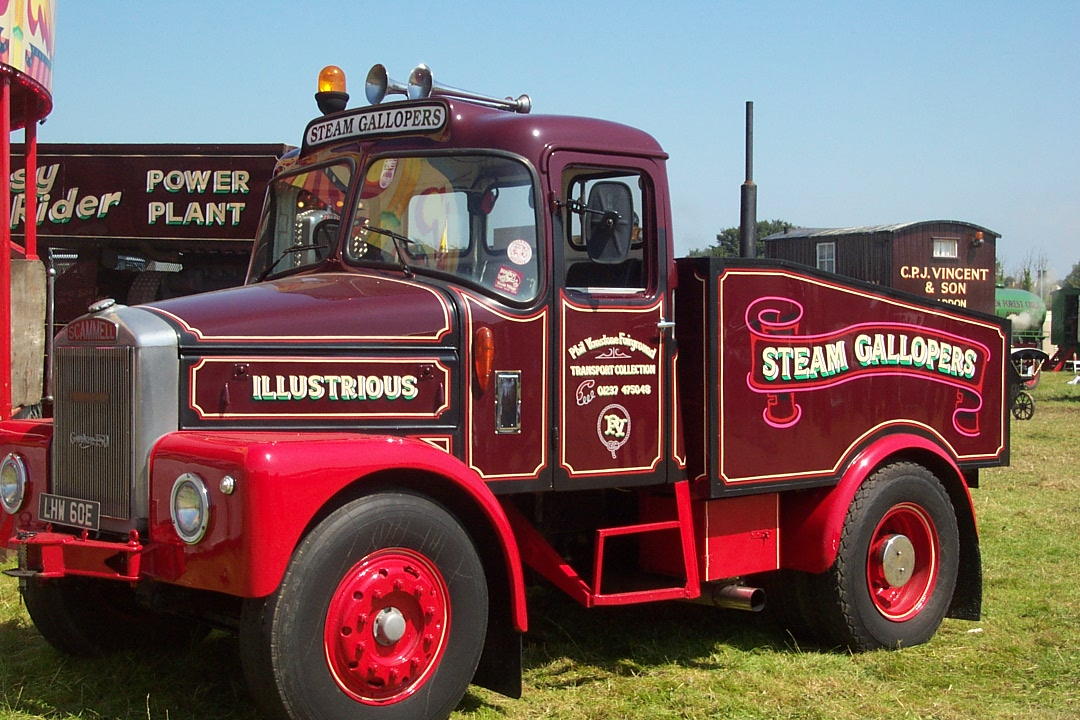
Scammell ballast tractor. Note the front drawbar coupling for pushing heavy loads

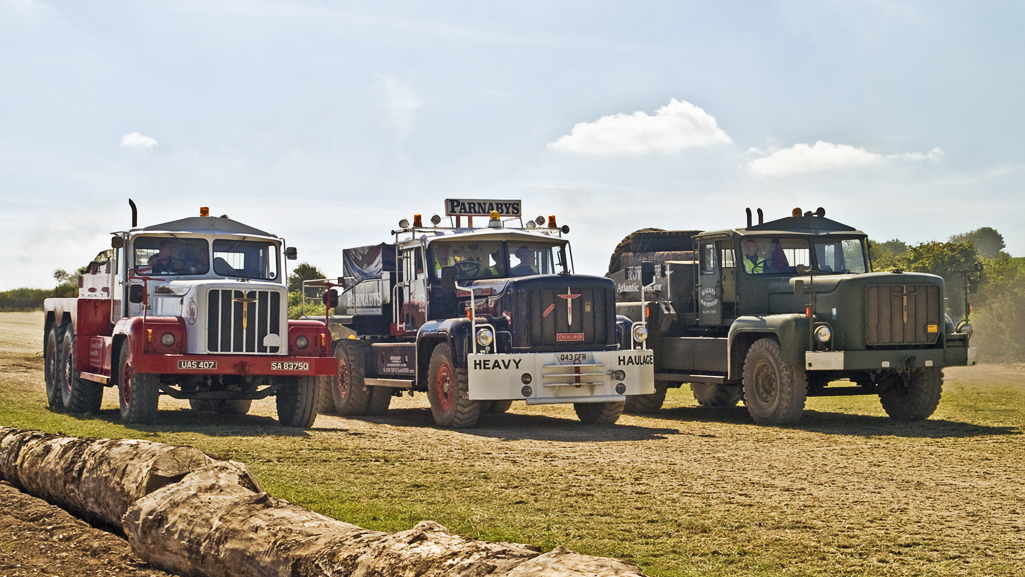
Three of the 11 surviving Rotinoff Atlantic ballast tractors

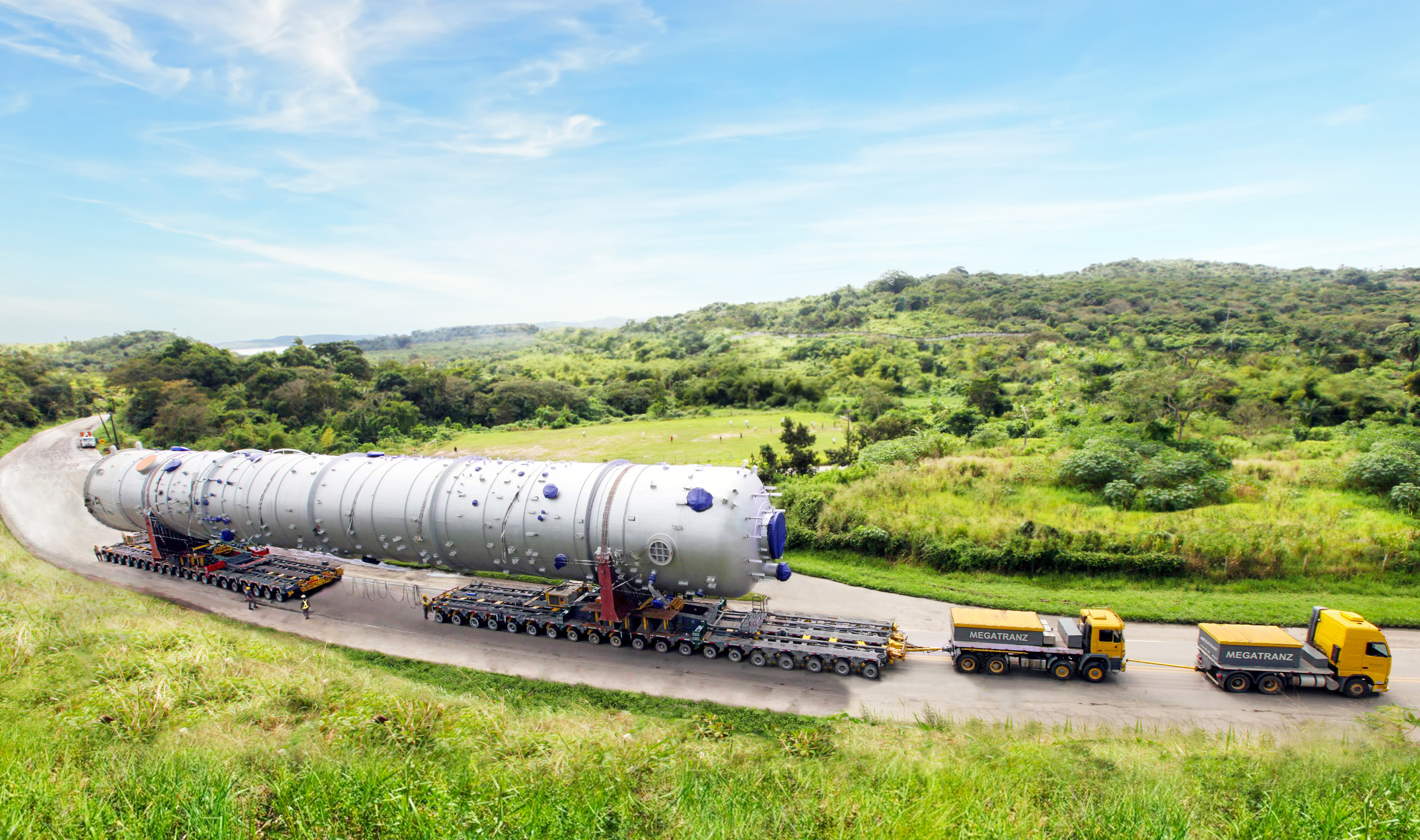
An MAN and a Volvo ballast tractor pulling load on TII hydraulic modular trailer.

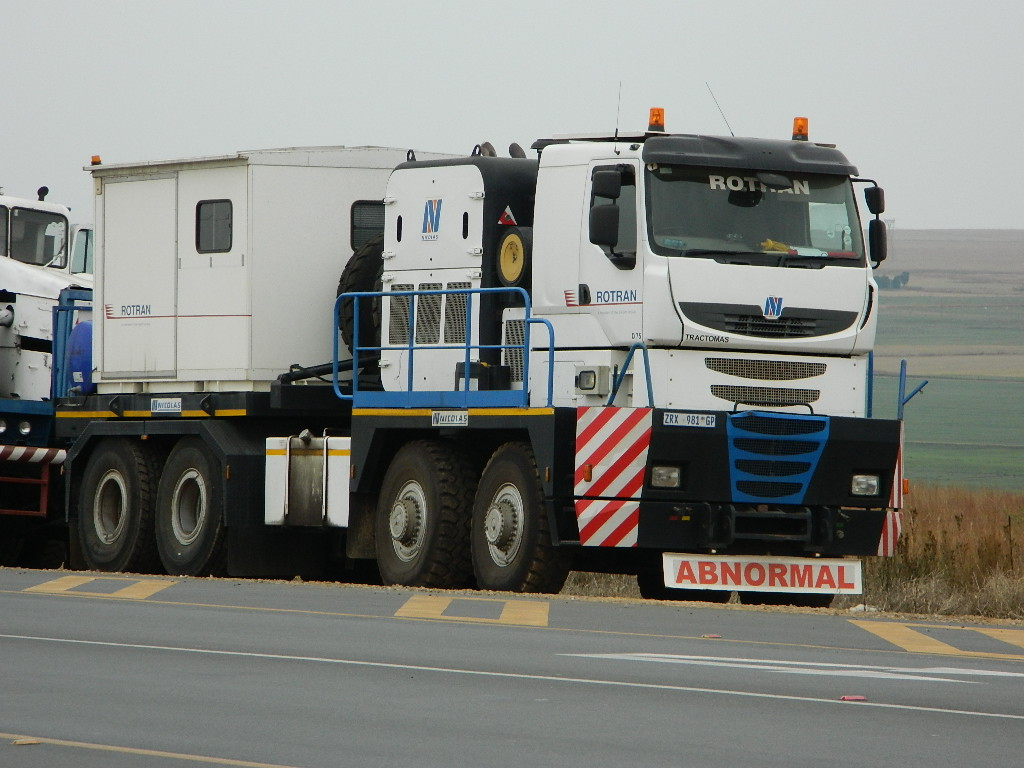
TII Nicolas Tractomas ballast tractor.

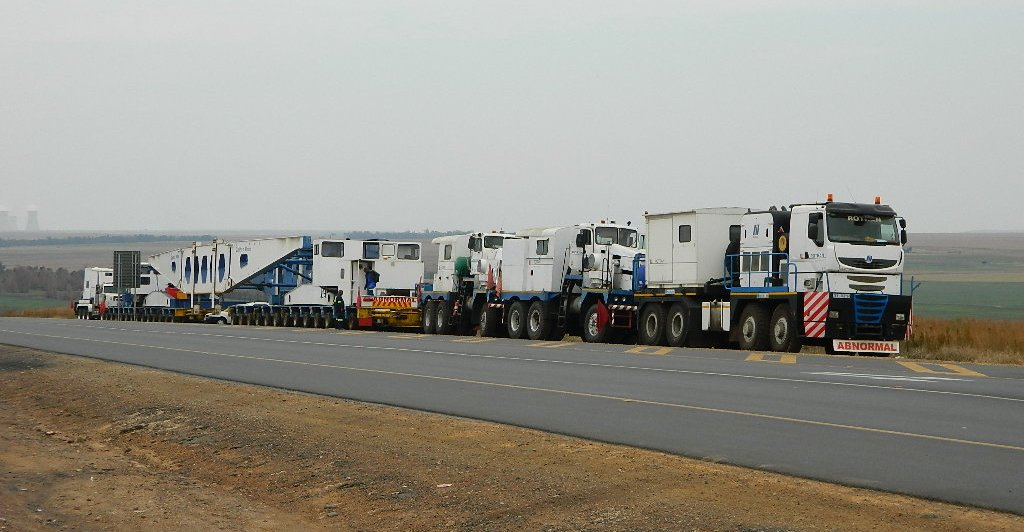
TII Nicolas Tractomas ballast tractors pulling a hydraulic modular trailer with girder bridge.

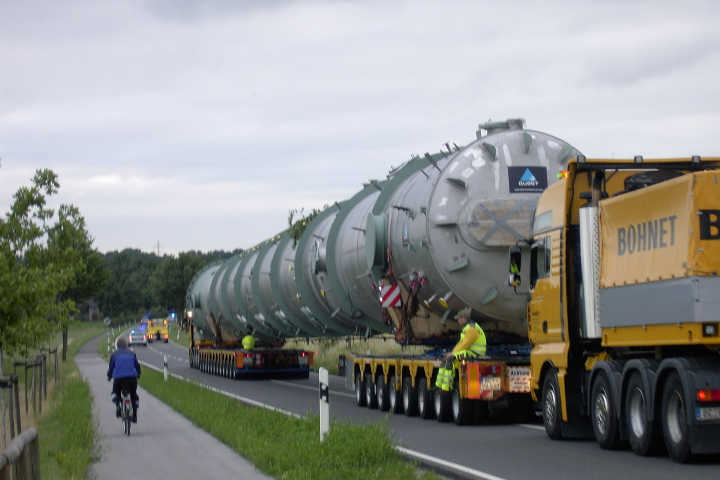
MAN ballast tractor pushing hydraulic modular trailer with bolster configuration.

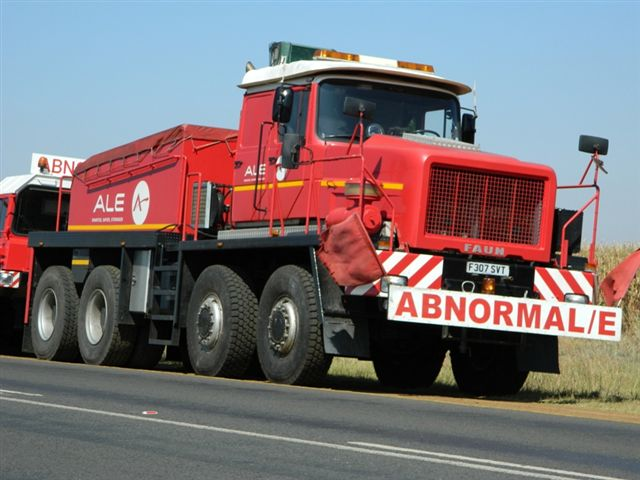
ALE Faun custom ballast tractor.

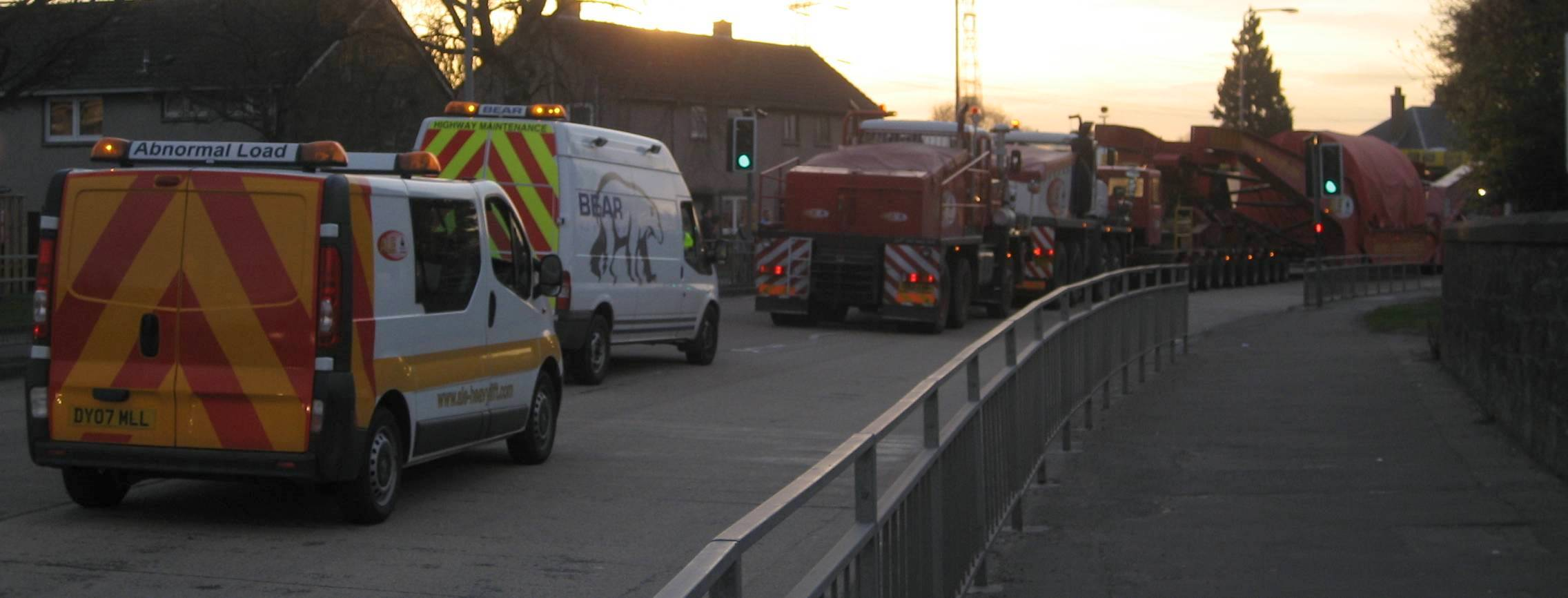
ALE Trojan ballast tractor pushing hydraulic modular trailer with girder bridge configuration.

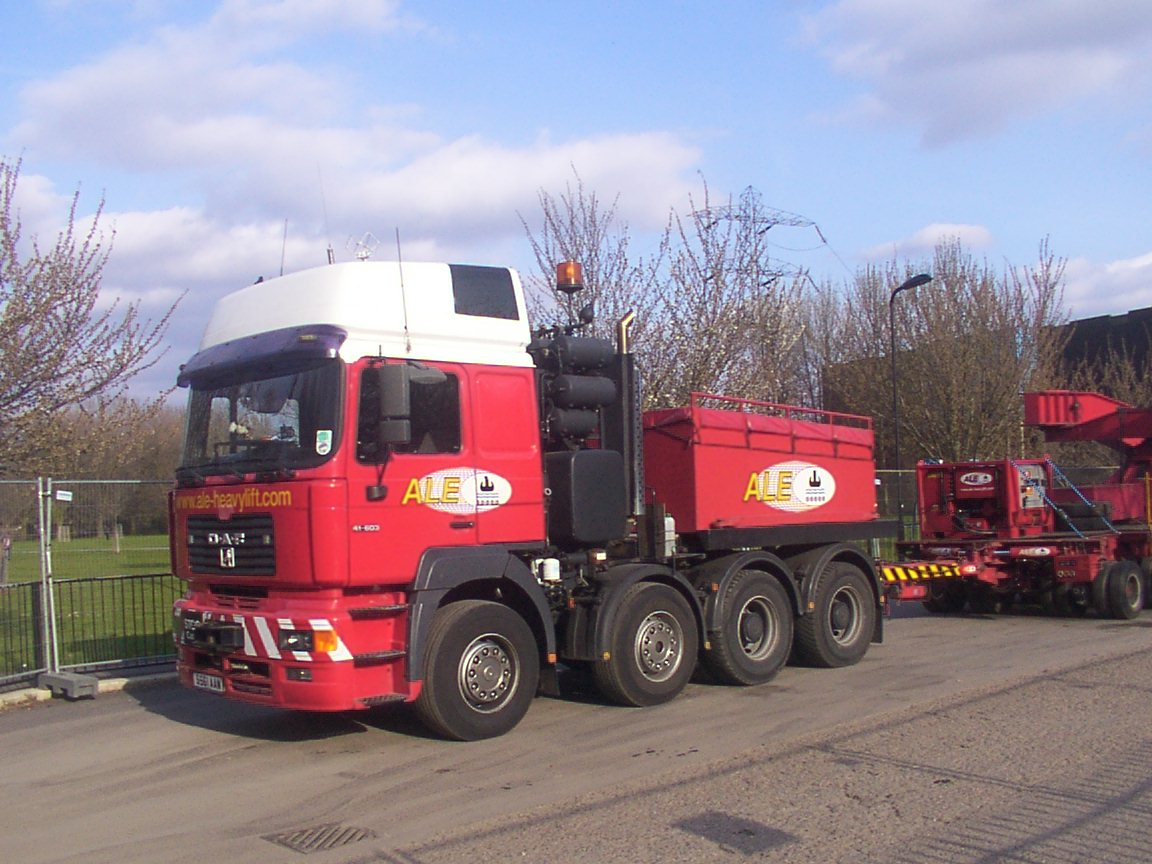
ALE MAN ballast tractor with drawbar connected to a hydraulic modular trailer.

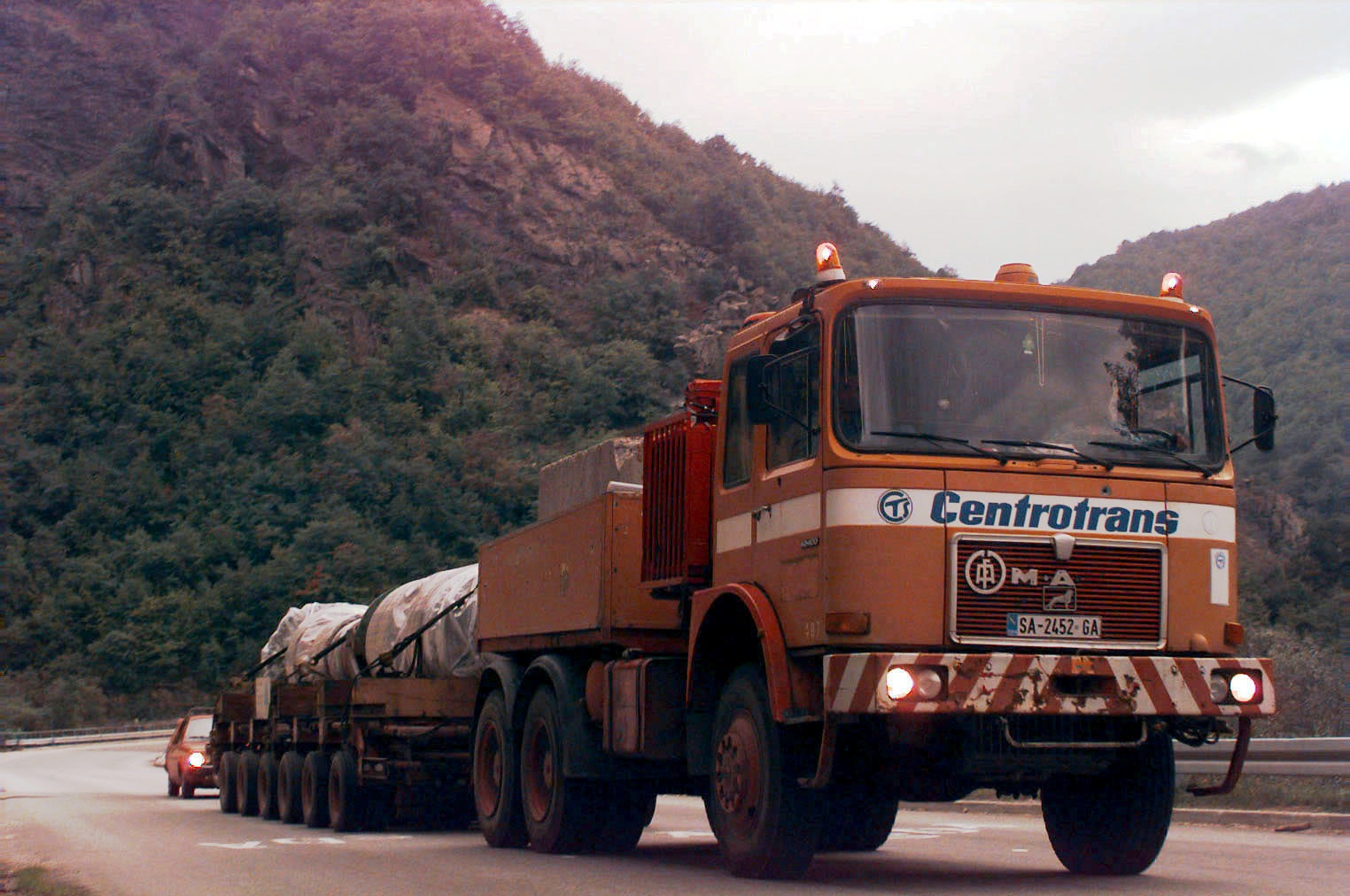
MAN ballast tractor pulling hydraulic modular trailer.

== See also ==
- Heavy hauler
- Prime mover
- Ringfeder
- Road locomotive – steam-powered fore-runner of the ballast tractor
- Toter
- Tractor unit
- Sisu K-50SS
- Hydraulic modular trailer
