= Champs-sur-Yonne =

- Commune
- Coat of arms
- Location of Champs-sur-Yonne
- Location within France Location within Bourgogne-Franche-Comté
- Coordinates: 47°44′17″N 3°36′06″E
- Country: France
- Region: Bourgogne-Franche-Comté
- Department: Yonne
- Arrondissement: Auxerre
- Canton: Auxerre-3
- Intercommunality: CA Auxerrois

Government
  - Mayor (2020–2026): Stéphane Antunes
- Area^{1}: 4.39 km^{2} (1.69 sq mi)
- Elevation: 109 m (358 ft)
- Highest elevation: 133 m (436 ft)
- Lowest elevation: 97 m (318 ft)
- Population (2023): 1,513
  - Density: 345/km^{2} (893/sq mi)
- Time zone: UTC+01:00 (CET)
  - Summer (DST): UTC+02:00 (CEST)
- INSEE/Postal code: 89077 /89290
- ^{1} French Land Register data, which excludes lakes, ponds, glaciers > 1 km^{2} (0.386 sq mi or 247 acres) and river estuaries.

Champ-sur-Yonne (French pronunciation: [ʃɑ̃ syʁ jɔn]) is a commune in the Yonne department in Bourgogne-Franche-Comté in north-central France.

Its inhabitants are called "Champicaunais". Champs-sur-Yonne is part of the metropolitan area of Auxerre

== Geography ==
Champs is in the Valley of the Yonne River, on the east bank of the river. The soil is alluvial, made both from local limestones and erosion products from the source of the Yonne in the Morvan. There is little agriculture in the mostly built up village, but typical crops include wheat, hemp, and sunflowers.

== History ==
There have been local settlements in the area since at least Roman times, but the growth of Champs as a distinct commune dates from the building of the three water mills on the Yonne in the eighteenth century.

== Population ==
Historical population
Year	Pop.	±% p.a.
1968	820	—
1975	1,163	+5.12%
1982	1,489	+3.59%
1990	1,525	+0.30%
1999	1,382	−1.09%
2007	1,578	+1.67%
2012	1,559	−0.24%
2017	1,574	+0.19%
2023	1,513	−0.66%
Source: INSEE

== See also ==
- Communes of the Yonne department
