= List of truck manufacturers =

This is a list of truck manufacturers, actual and defunct by region.

== Europe ==
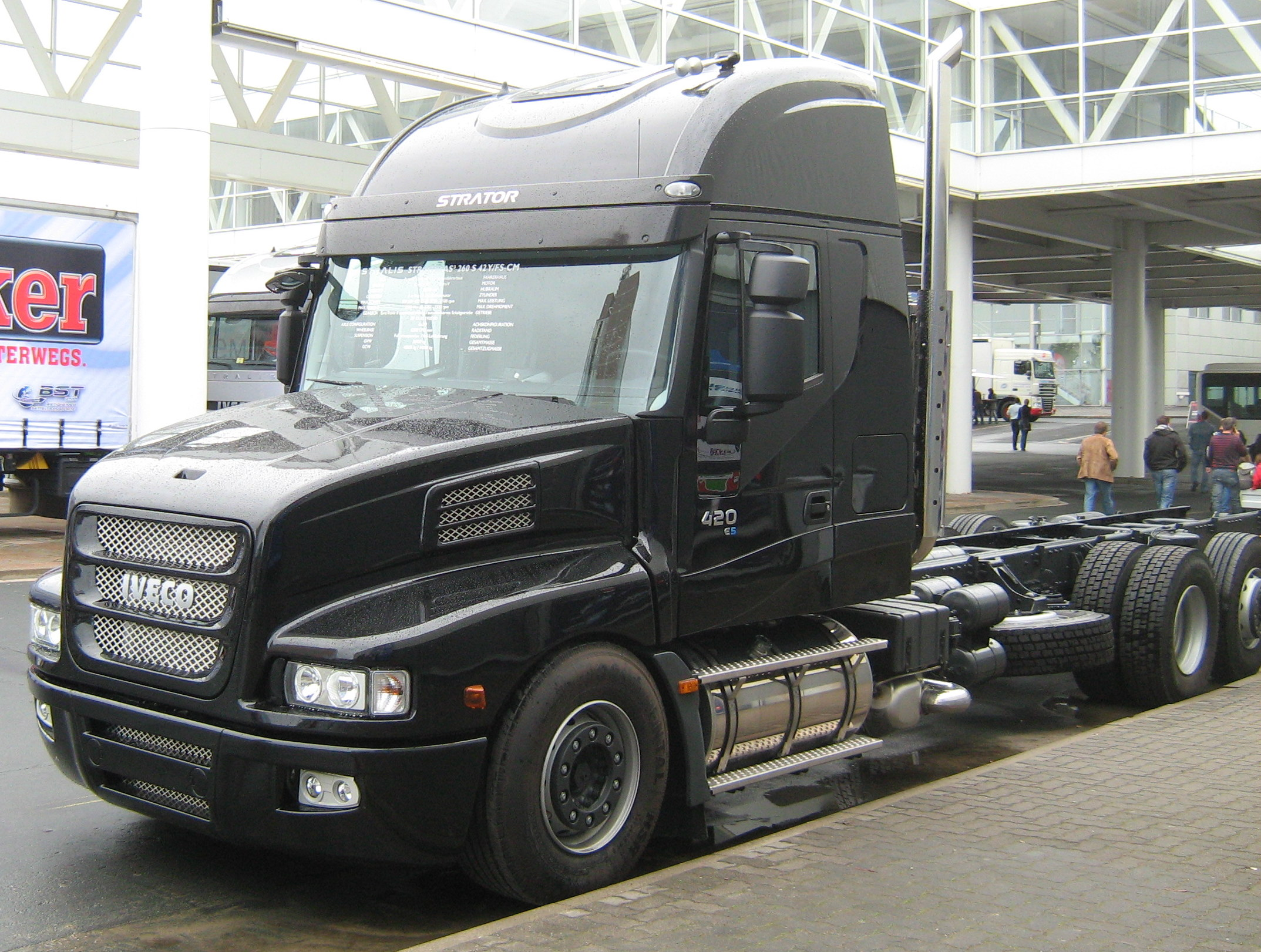
An Iveco PowerStar 420 E5 in Germany

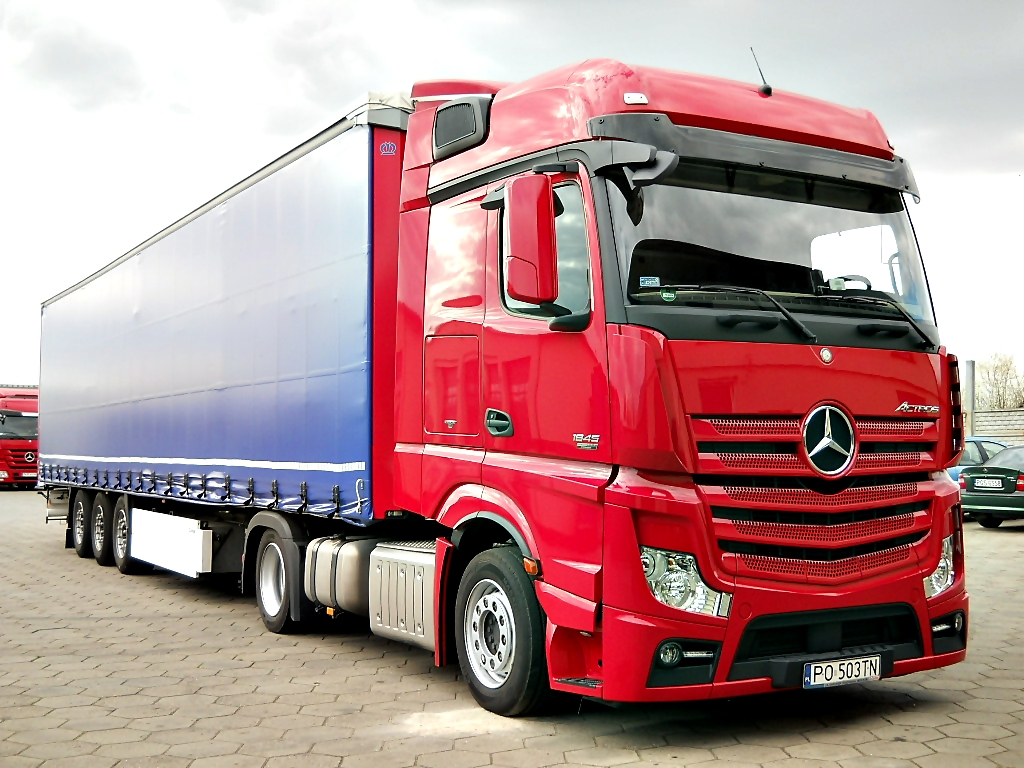
Mercedes-Benz Actros in Poland

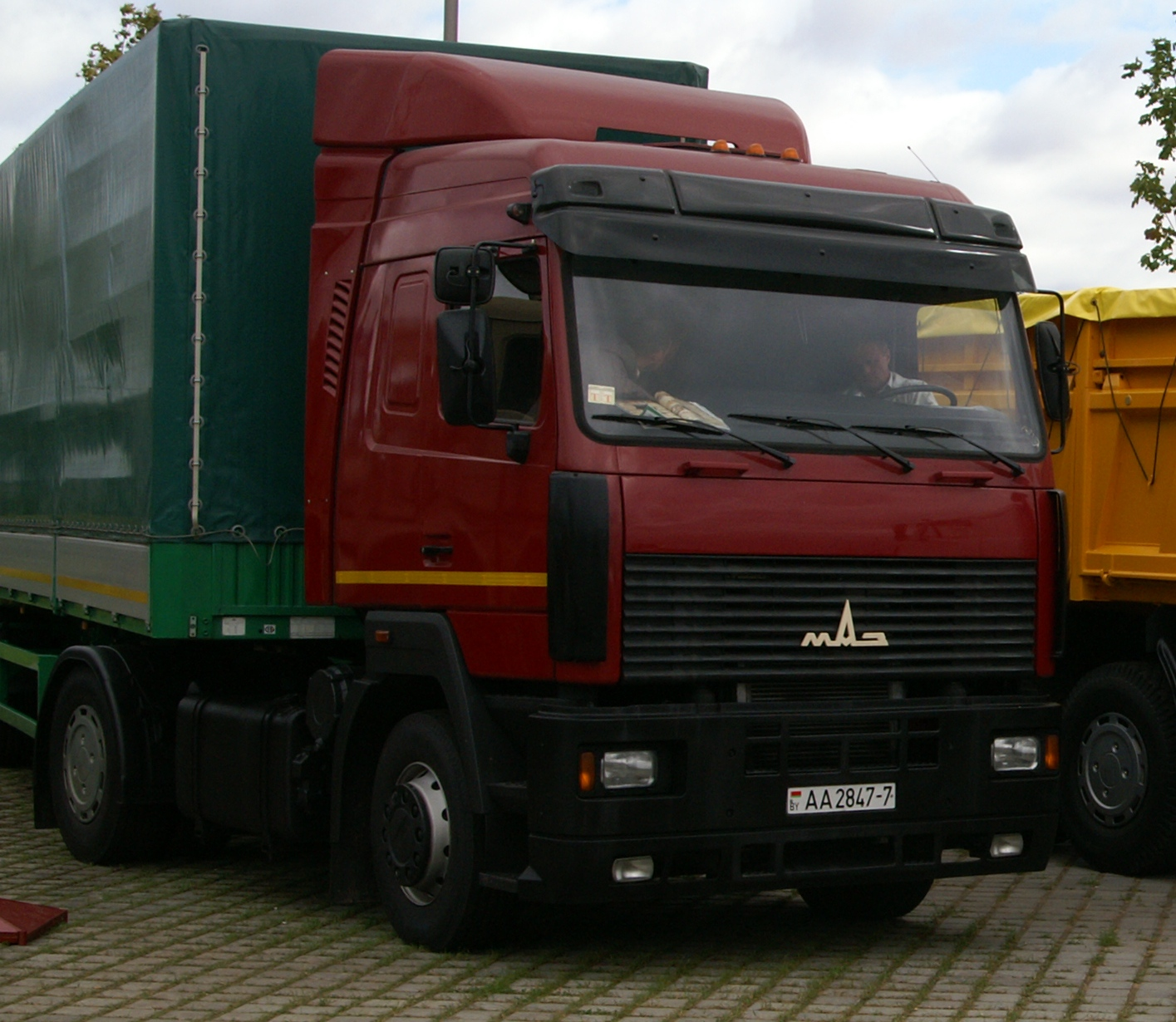
A MAZ 5440 in Minsk, Belarus

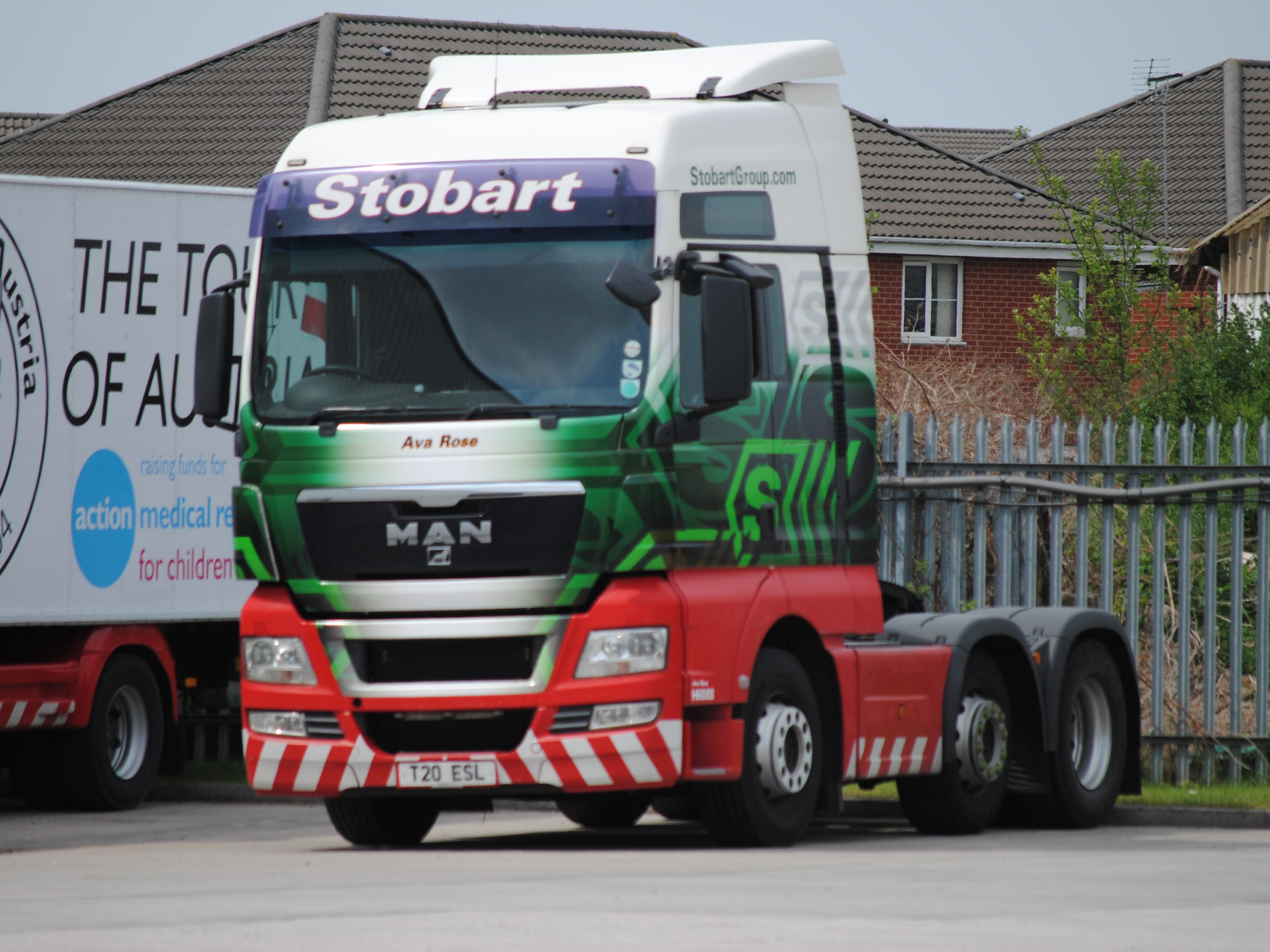
A MAN TGX in Widnes, England

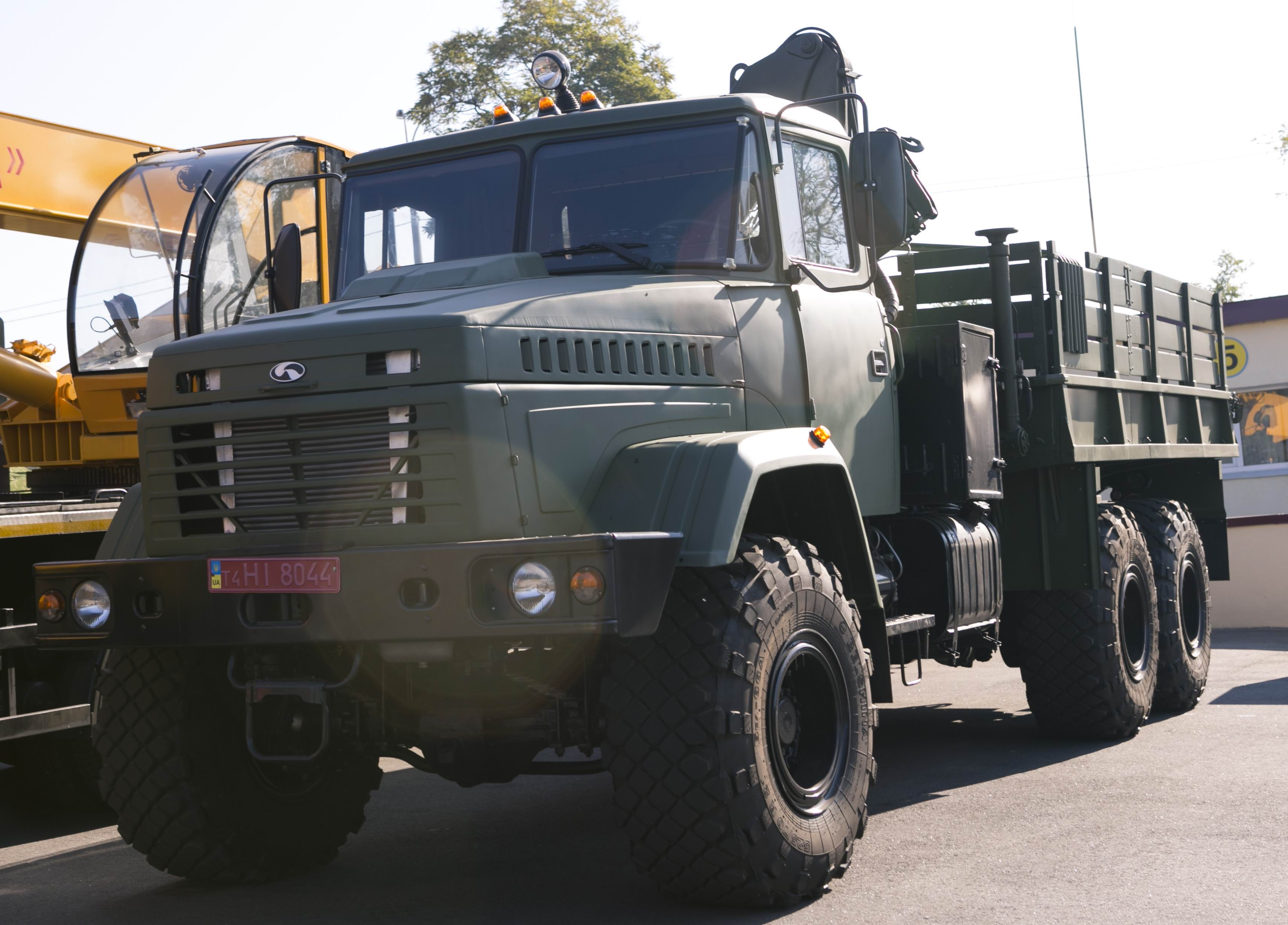
KrAZ-6322 in Kyiv, Ukraine

=== Austria ===
- Gräf & Stift (Austria)
- ÖAF (Austria)
- Steyr (Austria)

=== Belarus ===
- BelAZ (Belarus)
- MAZ (Belarus)
- MTZ (Belarus)
- MZKT (Belarus)

=== Belgium ===
- Brossel (Belgium)
- Miesse (Belgium)
- Minerva (Belgium)

=== Bulgaria ===
- Chavdar (Bulgaria)
- Madara (Bulgaria)
- Preslav (Bulgaria)

=== Czech Republic ===
- Avia Trucks (Czech Republic)
- LIAZ (Czech Republic) (1951–2002)
- Praga (Czech Republic)
- Škoda (Czech Republic)
- Tatra (Czech Republic)

=== Finland ===
- Sisu Auto (Finland)
- Vanaja (Finland)

=== France ===
- ACMAT (France)
- Berliet (France)
- Chenard-Walcker (France)
- Citroën (France)
- De Dion-Bouton (France)
- Delahaye (France)
- FAR Trucks (France)
- Hotchkiss (France)
- Labourier (France)
- Latil (France)
- Loheac (France)
- Lorraine-Dietrich (France)
- Nicolas (France)
- Panhard (France)
- Peugeot (France)
- Renault Trucks (France)
- Saviem (France)
- Sides (France)
- Simca (France)
- Somua (France)
- Unic (France)
- Willème (France)

=== Germany ===
- Barkas (Germany)
- Büssing (Germany)
- Borgward (Germany)
- Daimler AG (Germany)
- ELM Trucking (Germany)
- Ford (Germany)
- Grube (Germany)
- Hanomag (Germany)
- Henschel (Germany)
- Horch (Germany)
- IFA (Germany)
- Kaelble (Germany)
- Magirus (Germany)
- MAN (Germany)
- Mercedes-Benz (Germany)
- Multicar (Germany)
- Opel (Germany)
- Paul Nutzfahrzeuge (Germany)
- Robur (Germany)
- Tadano Faun GmbH (Germany)
- Titan (Germany)
- Unimog (Germany)
- Volkswagen Commercial Vehicles (Germany)
- Vomag (Germany)

=== Greece ===
- ELVO (Greece)
- Namco (Greece)
- Temax (Greece)

=== Hungary ===
- Csepel (Hungary)
- Raba (Hungary)

=== Italy ===
- Alfa Romeo (Italy)
- Astra (Italy)
- Fiat (Italy)
- Lancia (Italy)
- Officine Meccaniche (Italy)
- Officine Meccaniche Tortonesi (Italy)
- Iveco (Italy) (subsidiary of Tata Motors)

=== The Netherlands ===
- DAF Trucks (Netherlands)
- GINAF (Netherlands)
- Kromhout (Netherlands)
- FTF Trucks (Netherlands)
- Terberg (Netherlands)
- Verheul (Netherlands)

=== Poland ===
- Jelcz (Poland)
- Kalmar (Poland)
- Star (Poland)

=== Portugal ===
- Berliet-Tramagal (Portugal)
- Bravia SARL (Portugal)
- Mitsubishi Motors (Portugal)

=== Romania ===
- ATP Trucks (Romania)
- Bucegi (Romania)
- DAC (Romania)
- Roman (Romania)

=== Russia ===
- Avtomobilnoe Moskovskoe Obshchestvo (Russia)
- BAZ (Russia)
- Foton Motor (Russia)
- Gaz (Russia)
- Kamaz (Russia)
- Tonar (Russia)
- Ural (Russia)
- Yarovit (Russia)
- ZiL (Russia)

=== Serbia ===
- FAP (Serbia)
- Neobus (Serbia)
- Nibus (Serbia)
- Zastava TERVO (Serbia)
- Zastava Trucks (Serbia)

=== Slovenia ===
- TAM (Slovenia)
- TVM (Slovenia)

=== Sweden ===
- Scania (Sweden)
- Volvo Trucks (Sweden)

=== Spain ===
- Barreiros (Spain)
- Ebro (Spain)
- Hispano-Suiza (Spain)
- Pegaso (Spain)
- Santana Motor (Spain)
- TAM (trucks) (Spain)
- URO (Spain)

=== Switzerland ===
- Berna (Switzerland)
- FBW (Switzerland)
- Mowag (Switzerland)
- Saurer (Switzerland)

=== Turkey ===
- Ford Otosan (Turkey)
- Askam (Turkey)
- BMC Otomotiv (Turkey)
- Fargo (Turkey)
- Anadolu Isuzu (Turkey)
- Genoto (Turkey)
- Katmerciler (Turkey)
- Otokar (Turkey)

=== United Kingdom ===
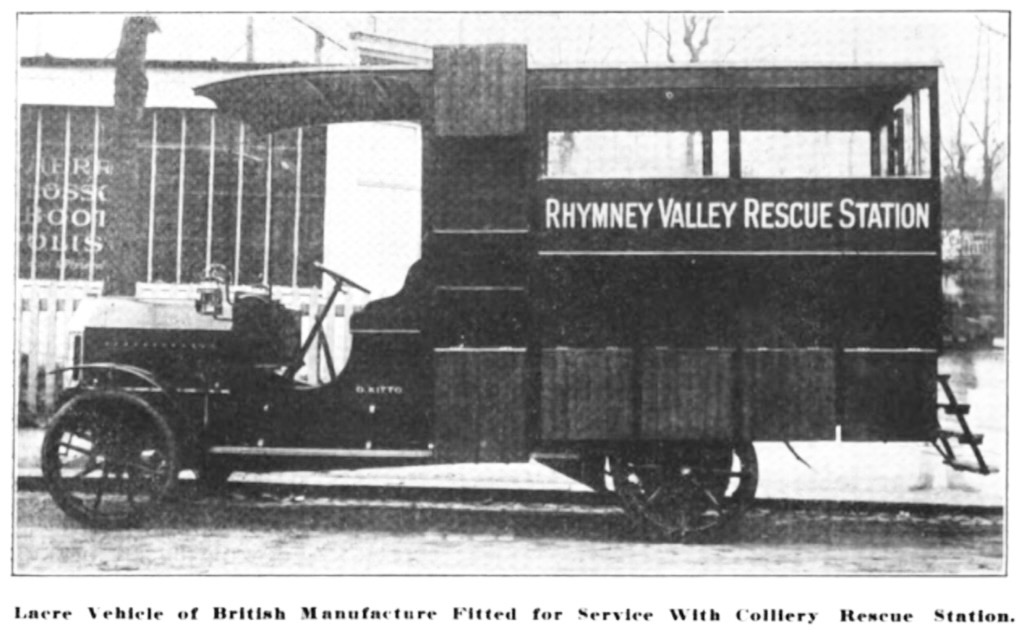
Lacre Truck (1912)

- Atkinson (UK)
- Austin (UK)
- AEC (UK)
- Albion (UK)
- Argyle (UK)
- Armstrong-Saurer (UK)
- AWD (UK)
- BAE Systems (UK)
- Baron (UK)
- Bean (UK)
- Beardmore (UK)
- Bedford (UK)
- Belsize Motors (UK)
- Bristol UD Trucks/Isuzu/Mitsubishi Fuso Truck And Bus Corporation/Hino Motors Joint Venture 100% (UK)
- British Ensign (UK)
- British Motor Corporation (UK)
- Bruce-SN (UK)
- H. G. Burford & Co. Ltd.
- Carmichael (UK)
- Caledon (UK)
- Churchill (UK)
- Clayton (UK)
- Commer (UK)
- Crossley (UK)
- C.T. (UK)
- Dennis UD Trucks/Isuzu/Fuso/Hino Motors Joint Venture 100% (UK)
- Dennis Eagle (UK)
- Dennis-Mann Egerton (UK)
- Dodge (UK)
- Douglas (UK)
- Enfield-Allday (UK)
- Foden (UK)
- Fodens (UK)
- Ford (UK)
- Foster (UK)
- Fowler (UK)
- Garner (UK)
- Garrett (UK)
- Gilford (UK)
- GV (UK)
- Guy (UK)
- Halley (UK)
- Hallford (UK)
- Hardy (UK)
- Haulamatic (UK)
- ERF (UK)
- HHT (UK)
- HSG (UK)
- Jensen (UK)
- Karrier (UK)
- Kerr Stuart (UK)
- Lacre (UK)
- Leyland (UK)
- Leyland DAF (UK)
- Lomount (UK)
- Manchester (UK)
- Mann (UK)
- Maudslay (UK)
- McCurd (UK)
- Morris (UK)
- Morris Commercial (UK)
- Motor Traction (UK)
- Multiwheeler (UK)
- Norde (UK)
- Pagefield (UK)
- Proctor (UK)
- Quest (UK)
- Rotinoff (UK)
- Rowe-Hillmaster (UK)
- Rutland (UK)
- Scammell (UK)
- SD (UK)
- Seddon (UK)
- Seddon Atkinson (UK)
- Sentinel (UK)
- Shefflex (UK)
- Star (UK)
- Straker-Squire (UK)
- Straussler (UK)
- Tata Motor UK (UK)
- Thames (UK)
- Thornycroft (UK)
- Three (UK)
- Tilling-Stevens (UK)
- TVW (UK)
- Union (UK)
- Unipower (UK)
- USG-Pitt (UK)
- Vulcan (UK)
- Yorkshire (UK)
- Zwicky (UK)

=== Ukraine ===
- KrAZ (Ukraine)
- LAZ (Ukraine)

=== Other Countries ===
- Dennison (Ireland)
- Ganja Auto Plant (Azerbaijan)
- KAZ (Georgia)

== Asia ==
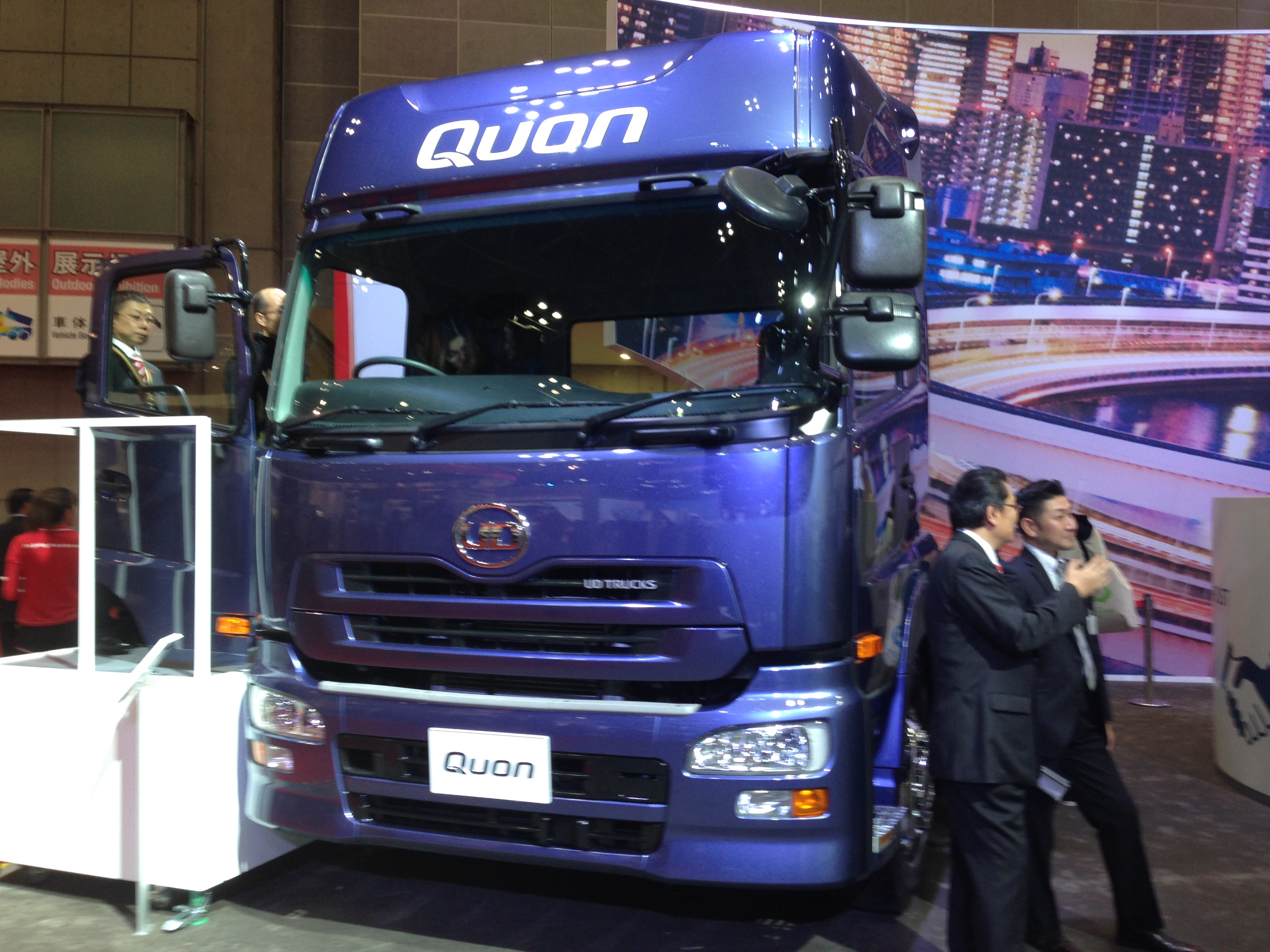
UD Quon in Japan

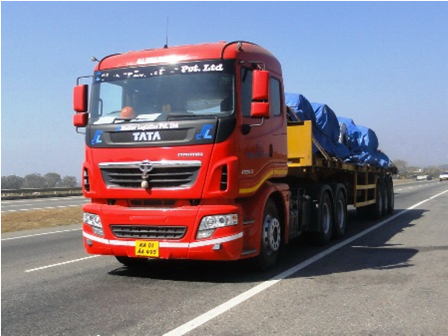
Tata Prima in India

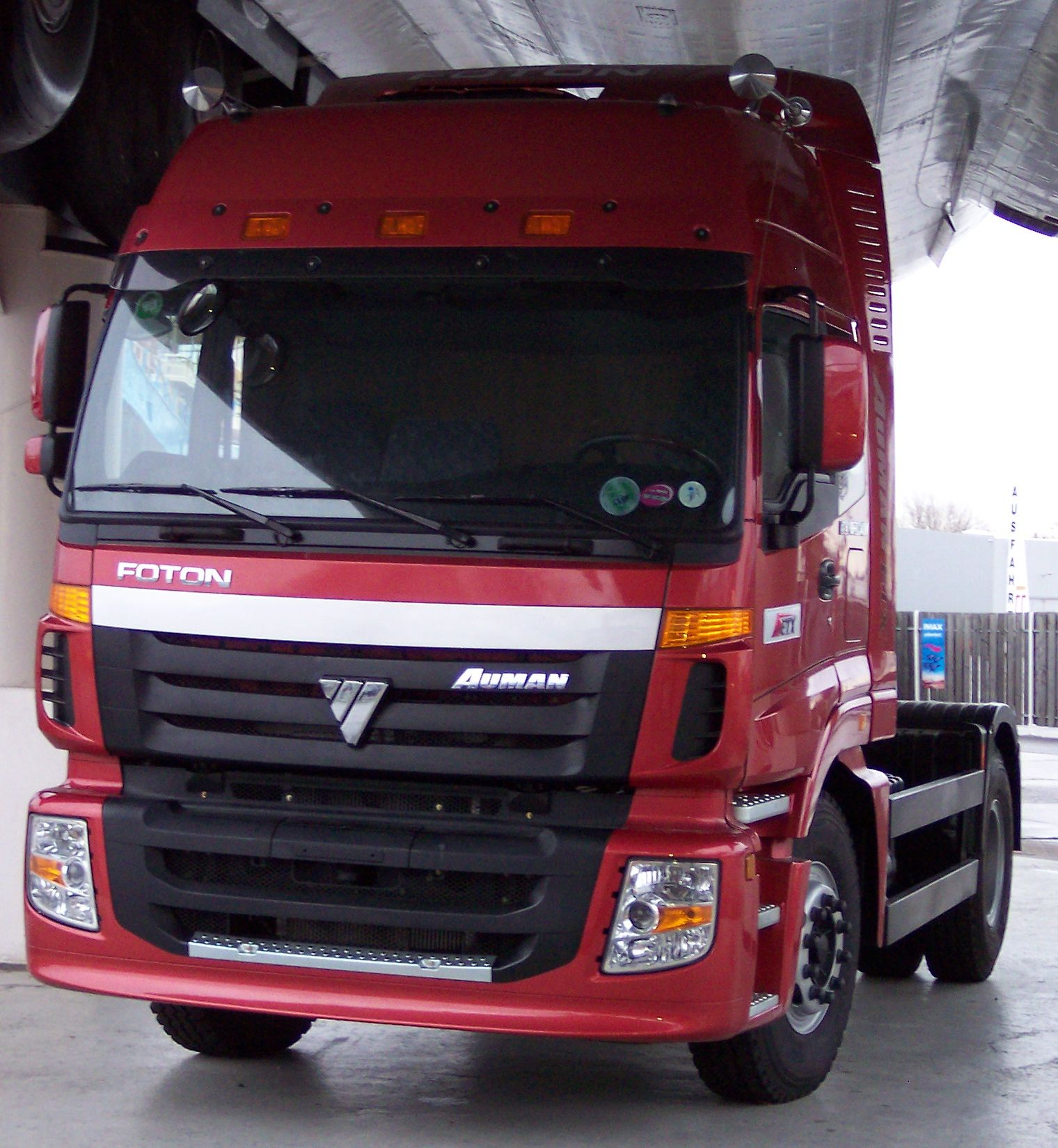
Foton Auman in China

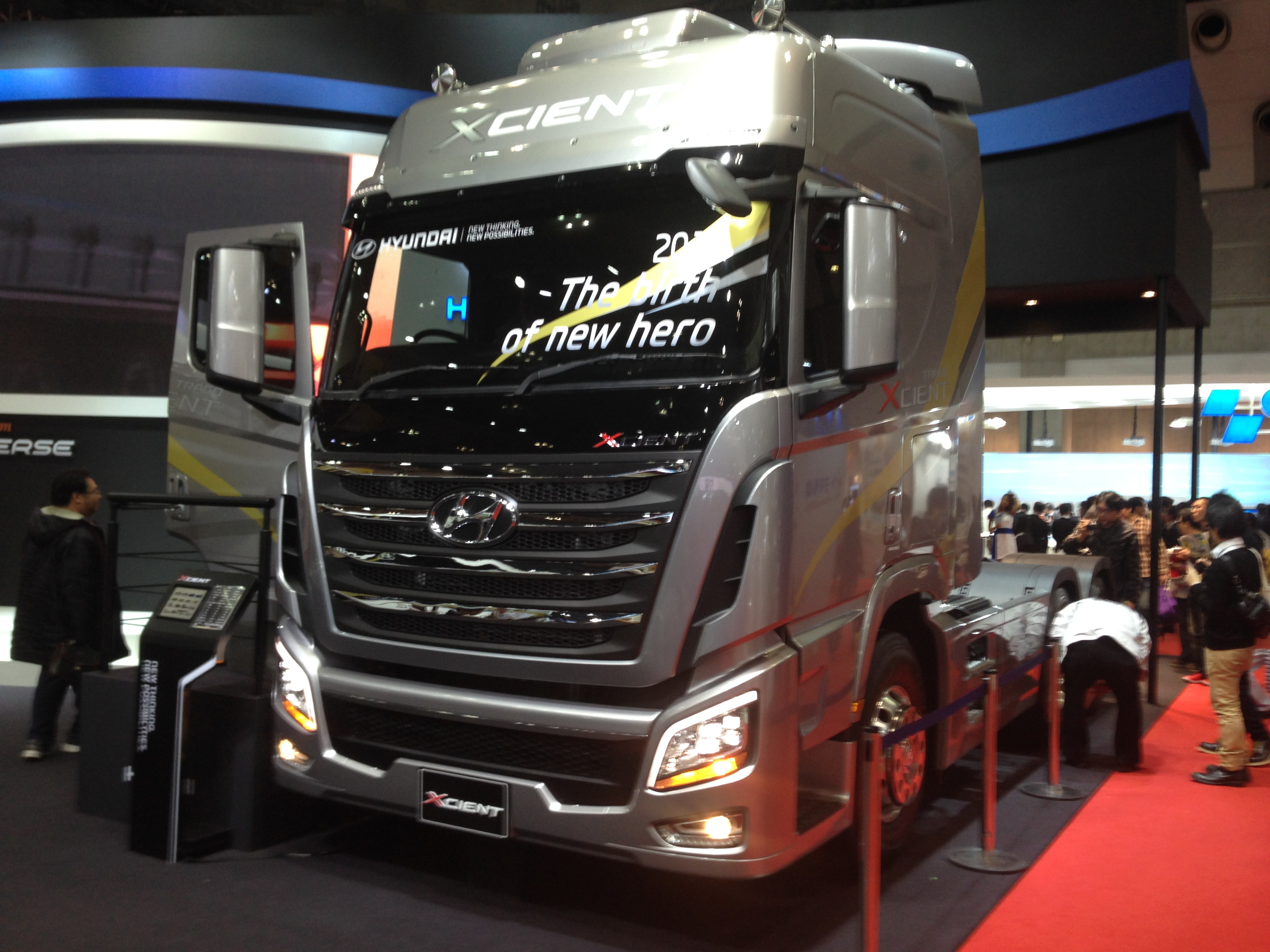
Hyundai Xcient in South Korea

=== China ===
- BAW (China)
- Beiben (China)
- Foton Motor (China)
- BYD Company (China)
- Chengli Special Automobile (China)
- Chery (China)
- Sinotruk (China)
- Chingkangshan (China)
- Ziyang Nanjun (China)
- CHTC (China)
- CNHTC (China)
- Dongfeng Liuzhou Motor (China)
- Dongfeng Motor Corporation (China) – Nissan Diesel/Cummins joint venture
- FAW (China)
- Hohan (China)
- Hualing Xingma Automobile (China)
- Jianghuai Automobile (China)
- Jiangling Motors (China)
- Jiaotong (China)
- Jiefang (China)
- Lovol Heavy Industry (China)
- Qingling (China)
- Sany (China)
- Shaanxi Automobile Group (China)
- Shacman (China)
- Sitrak (China)
- Sitom (China)
- Tangjun Ou Ling (China)
- XCMG (China)
- Xiaolong Automotive Technologies Co., Ltd (China)
- YTO (China)
- Yuejin (China)

=== India ===
- Ashok Leyland (India)
- ~~Asia MotorWorks (AMW)~~ (Liquidated)
- Daimler India (BharatBenz) (India)
- VE Commercial Vehicles (Volvo/Eicher) (India)
- Force Motors (India)
- JSW Greentech (Ampstar) (India)
- Hindustan Motors (India)
- Mahindra Truck and Bus Division (India)
- ~~MAN Truck & Bus~~ (left in 2018)
- ~~Premier Automobiles~~ (Bankrupt)
- Scania (India division)
- SML Mahindra (India)
- Tata Motors (India)
- TVS (India)
- Vehicle Factory Jabalpur (India)
- Blue Energy Motors (India)
- Euler Motors (India)
- Montra Electric (India)
- Propel Industries (India)
- Omega Seiki Mobility (India)

=== Japan ===
- Daihatsu (Japan) – 51% owned by Toyota
- Fuso (Japan)
- Hino Motors (Japan) - subsidiary of Toyota
- Isuzu (Japan)
- Komatsu (Japan)
- Nissian/Minsei (Japan)
- UD Trucks (Japan)

=== Iran ===
- Dand (Iran)
- Amico (Iran)
- Arna (Iran)
- Arya (Iran)
- HEPCO (Iran)
- Persika (Iran)
- Kaveh (Iran)

=== South Korea ===
- ~~Daewoo~~(South Korea) (defunct in 1999)
- Hyundai (South Korea)
- Tata Daewoo (South Korea) – subsidiary of Tata Motors
- Kia Corporation (South Korea)
- KG Mobility (South Korea)

=== Indonesia ===
- Matra Fire (Indonesia)
- Texmaco (Indonesia)

=== Pakistan ===
- Ghandhara Industries (Pakistan)
- Hinopak Motors (Pakistan)
- Master Motors (Pakistan)

=== Other ===
- AIL (Israel)
- HICOM (Malaysia)
- GA (Azerbaijan)
- KAZ (Georgia)
- KMC (Cyprus)
- Vinaxuki (Vietnam)

== North America ==
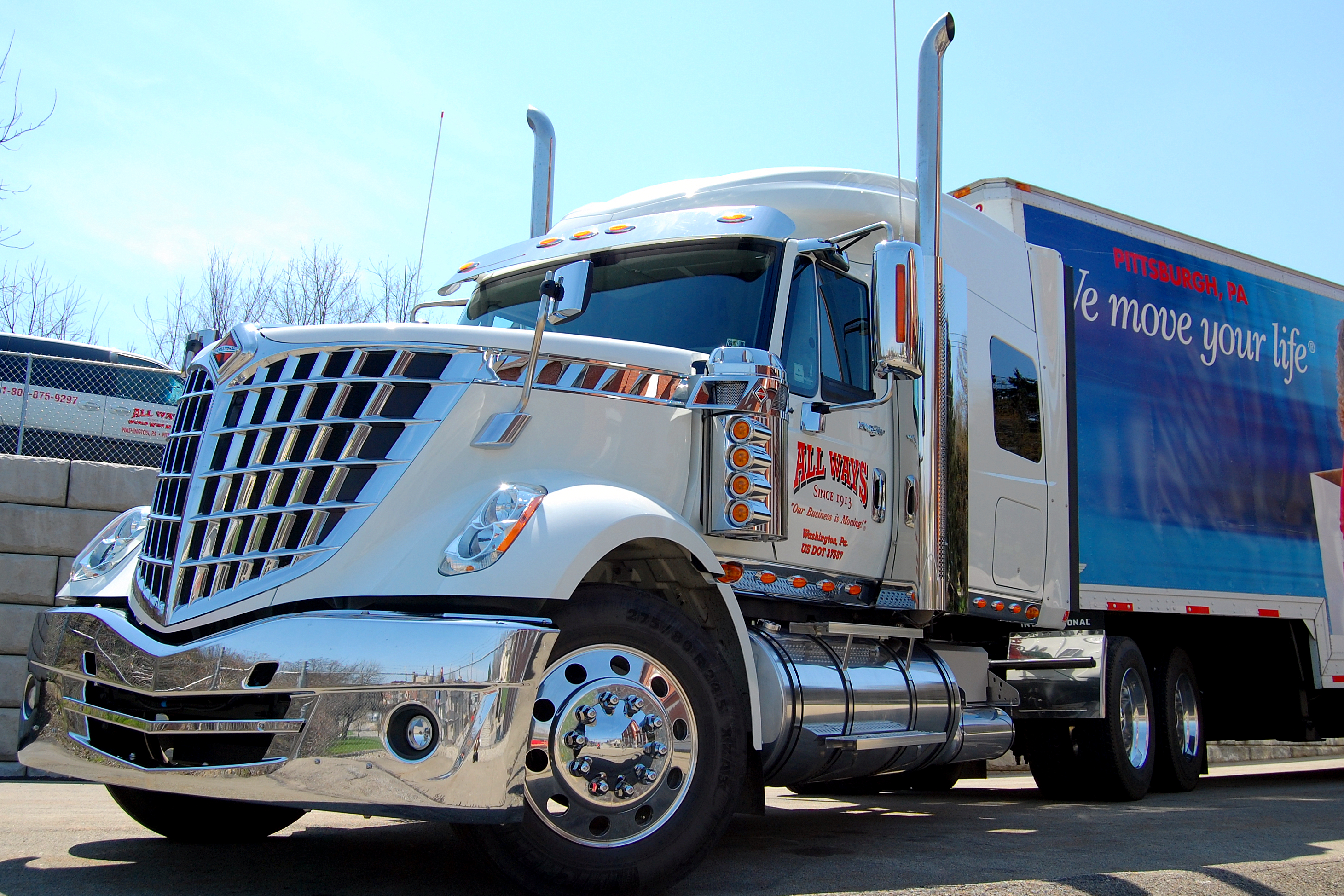
An International LoneStar

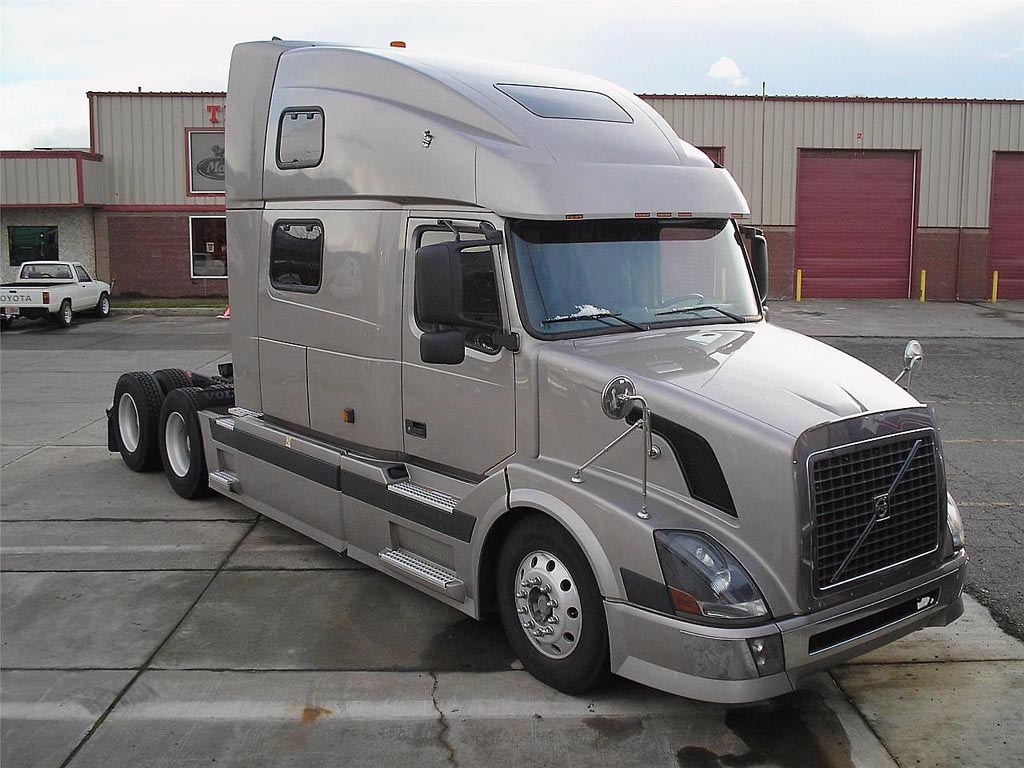
A Volvo VN 780 in the United States

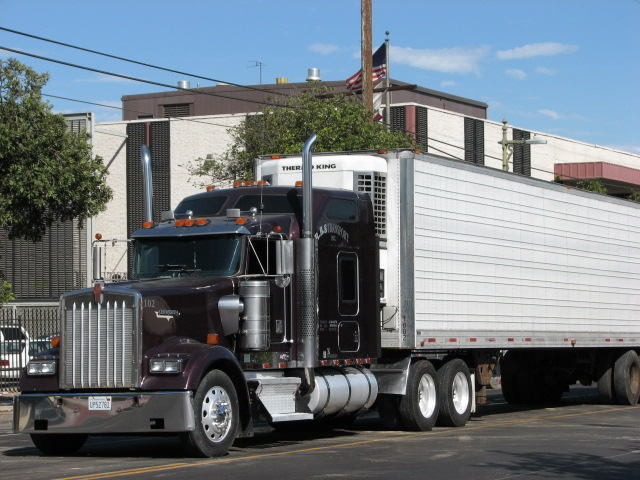
A Kenworth W900 in California, US

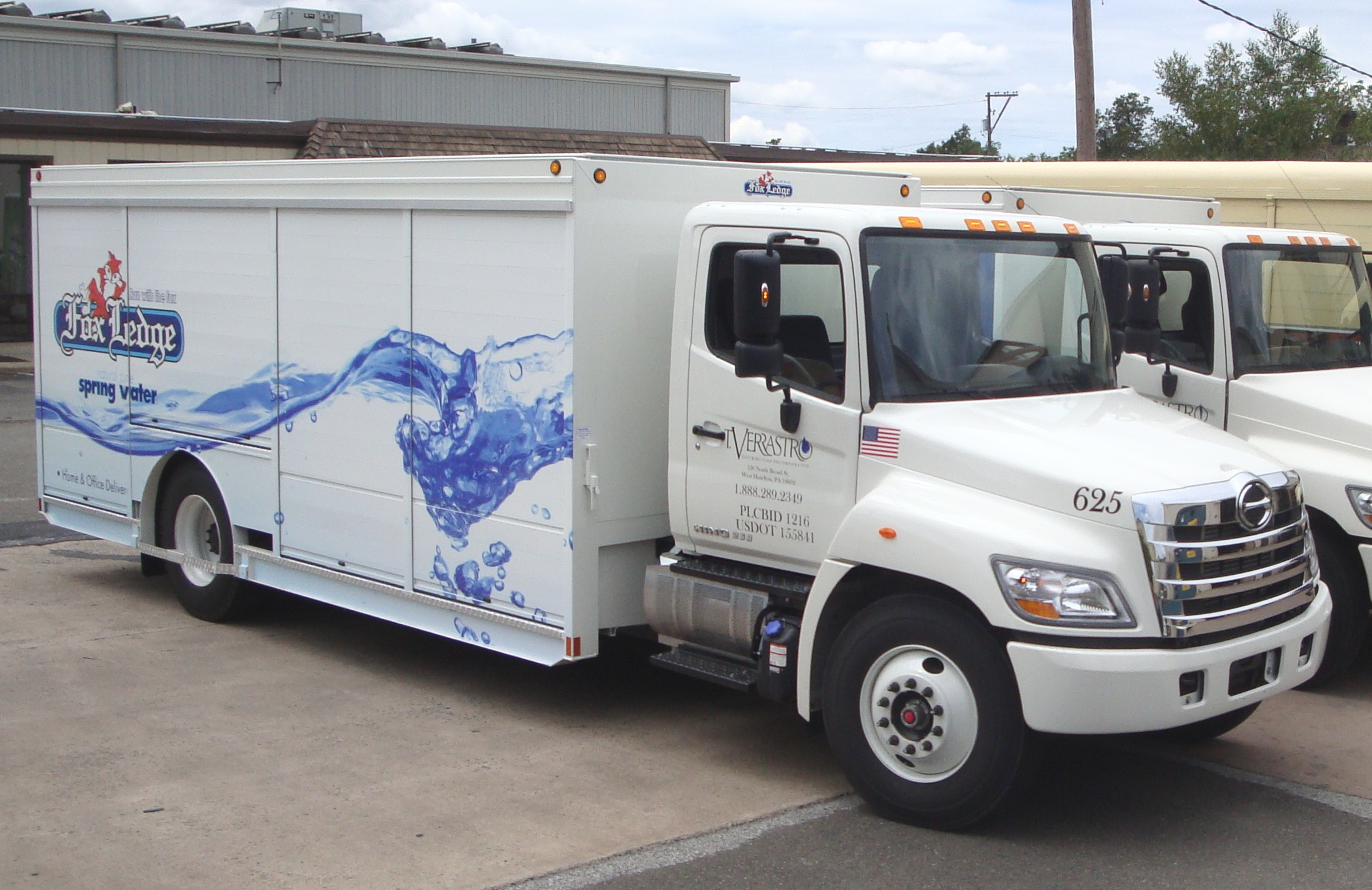
A Hino 238 in the United States
- American Coleman
- ~~American LaFrance~~ (defunct in 2014)
- Autocar Company (United States)
- Available
- Bailey
- Bering Trucks
- Brockway
- Brown
- Canadian Car Corporation (Canada)
- Crane Carrier Corporation (United States)
- Chevrolet (United States)
- Cline
- Colet
- Corbitt
- Dart (United States)
- DeSoto
- Diamond T
- Dina (Mexico)
- Dodge (United States)
- E-One (United States)
- Edison Motors (Canada)
- Fageol (United States)
- Flextruc (Canada)
- Ford (United States)
- Freeman
- Federal
- Freightliner Trucks (United States)
- Fuso (different models for U.S. market)
- FWD Auto Company
- Gersix (United States; became Kenworth in 1923))
- GMC (United States)
- General Motors Canada (Canada)
- Gotfredson
- Greenkraft Inc
- General Vehicle (United States)
- Hayes Truck (United States)
- Hendrickson
- Hino (different models for U.S. market)
- HME
- Hug (United States)
- Ibex
- International Motors
- Isuzu (different models for U.S. market)
- Jarrett (United States)
- Jeffedry Quad (United States)
- Kenworth (United States)
- Knox (United States)
- Liberty (United States)
- Lion Electric Company (Canada)
- Mack Trucks (United States)
- Marmon (United States)
- Marmon-Herrington (United States)
- Moreland (United States)
- Nikola (United States)
- Nissan (different models for U.S. market)
- Orange EV (United States)
- Oshkosh (United States)
- Kalmar Industries (formerly Ottawa) (yard switch trucks)
- Paccar (United States)
- Paymaster
- Peterbilt (United States)
- Pierce (United States)
- Ramirez (Mexico)
- Rapid (United States)
- Relay (United States)
- Reo (United States)
- Republic (United States)
- Riker (United States)
- Spangler (United States)
- Spartan (United States)
- Sterling Trucks (United States)
- Stewart & Stevenson (United States)
- Studebaker (United States)
- Scot (Canada)
- Tesla Motors (United States)
- Traffic (United States)
- UD Trucks (different models for U.S. market)
- Volvo Trucks (different models for U.S. market)
- Vicinity Motor Corp. (Canada)
- Walter (United States)
- White (United States)
- Western Star Trucks (United States)
- Zeligson (United States)

== South America ==
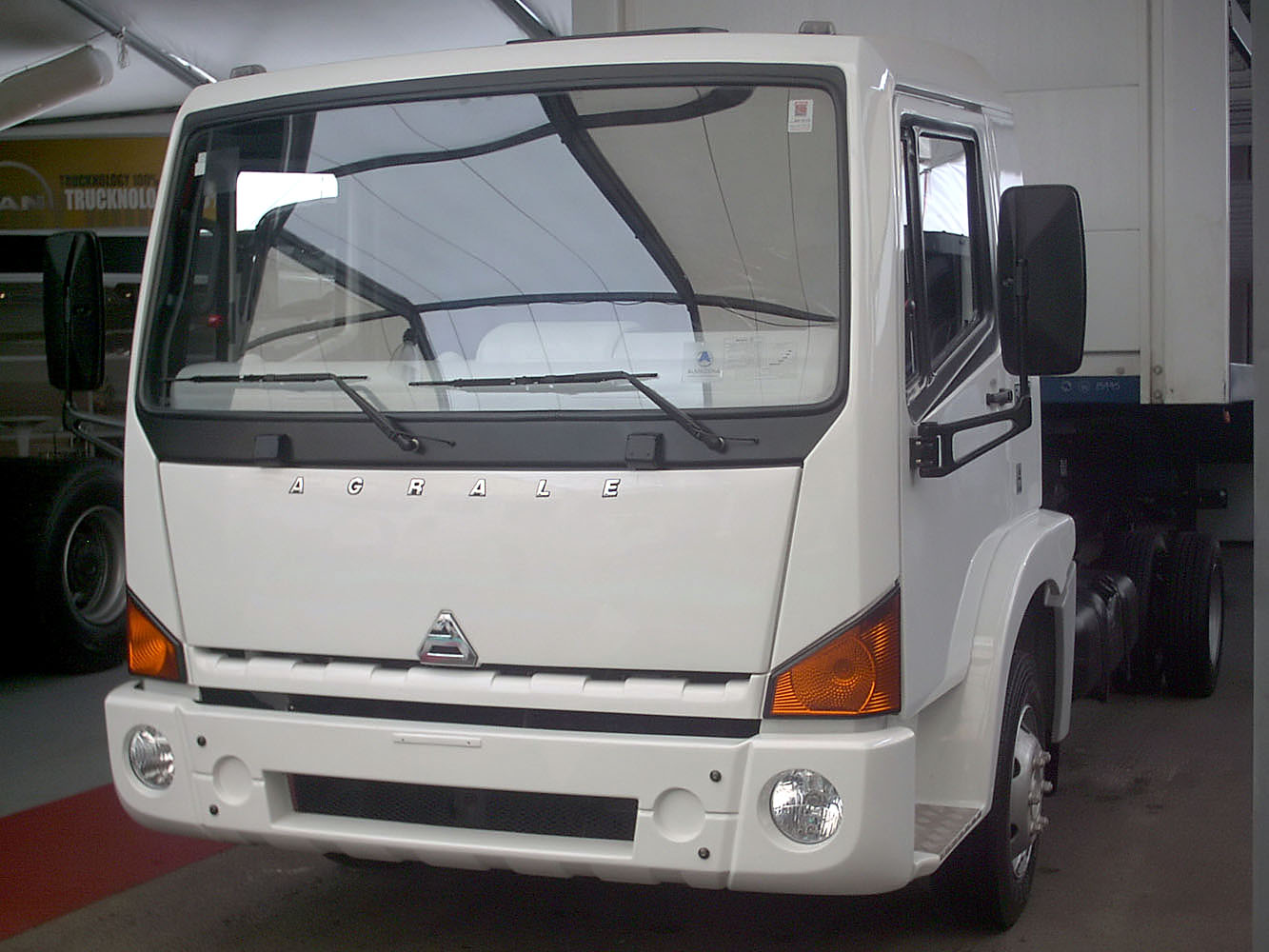
Agrale 8500 E-Tronic
- Agrale (Brazil)
- Volkswagen Truck and Bus (Brazil)

== Africa ==
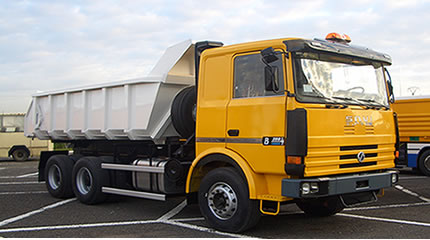
A B400 model made by the company SNVI (Algeria)

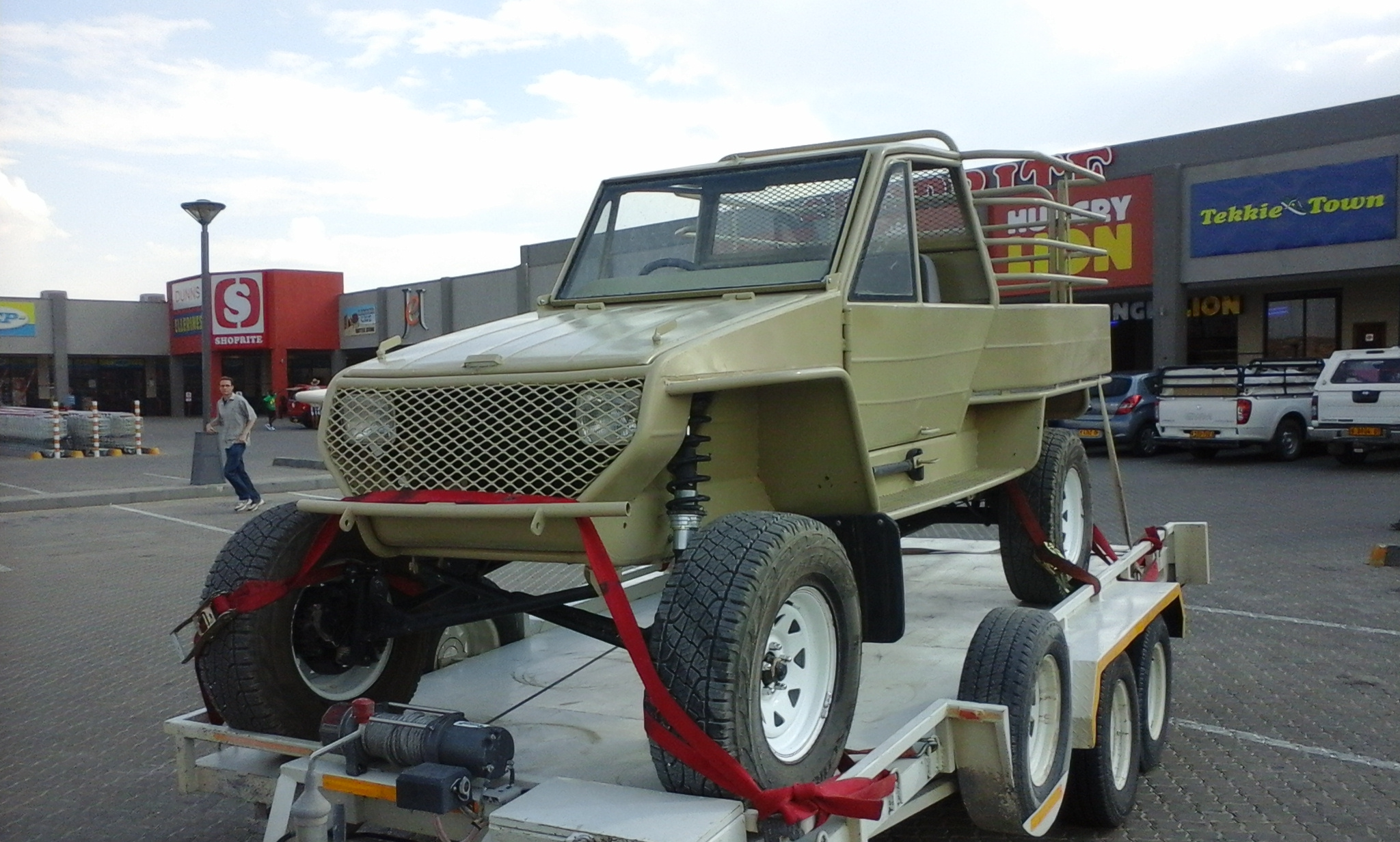
Uri Desert Runner (Namibia)
- AVM (Zimbabwe)
- Isuzu (South Africa)
- Mahindra Motors African (Mauritius)
- Tata Motors Africa (Kenya)
- Ralph (truck manufacturer)
- SAMIL (South Africa)
- SNVI (Algeria)
- UD Trucks (Southern Africa)
- Uri (Namibia and South Africa)
- Volvo Trucks (South Africa)

== Oceania ==
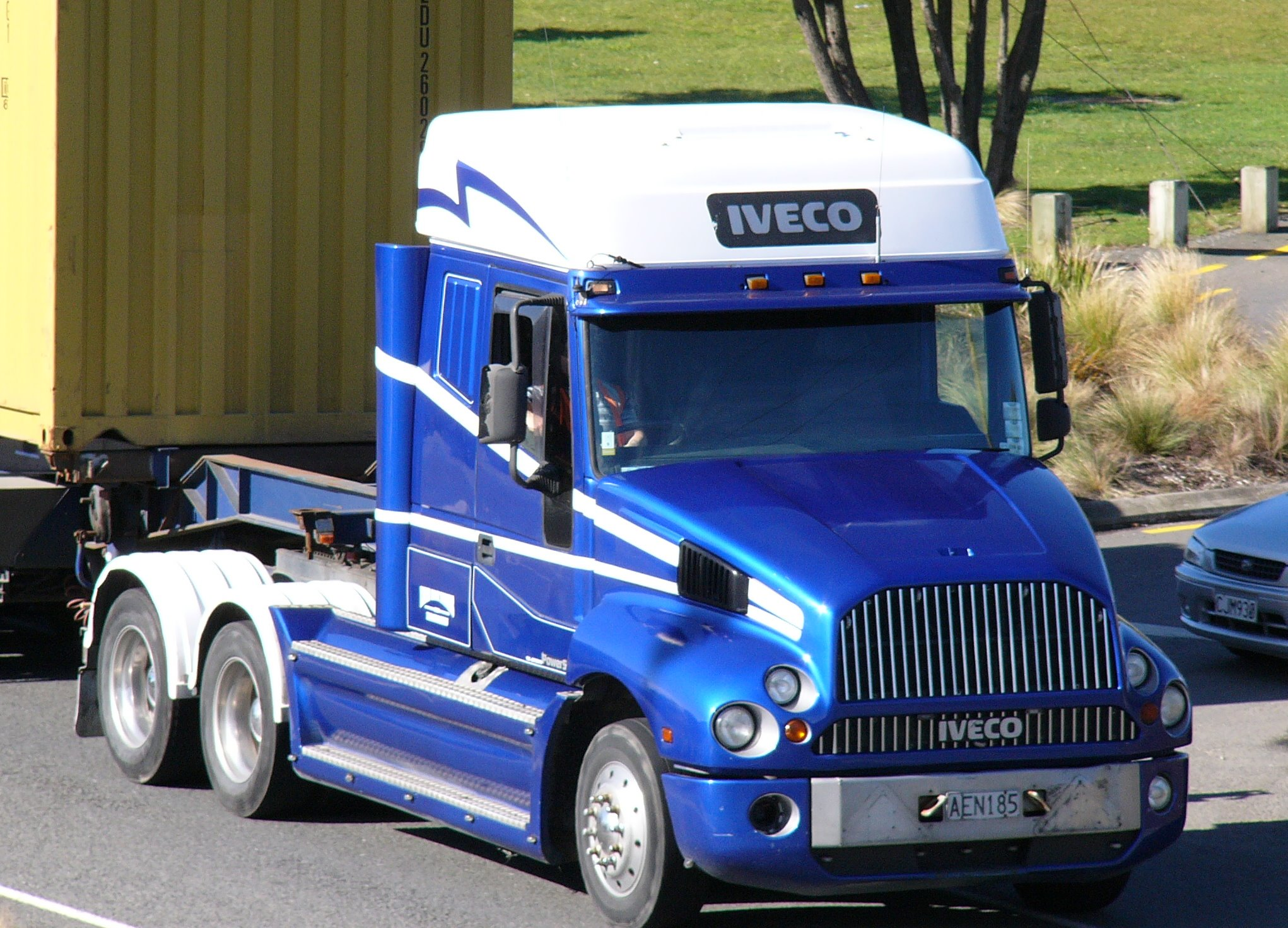
A pre-generation Iveco PowerStar in New Zealand

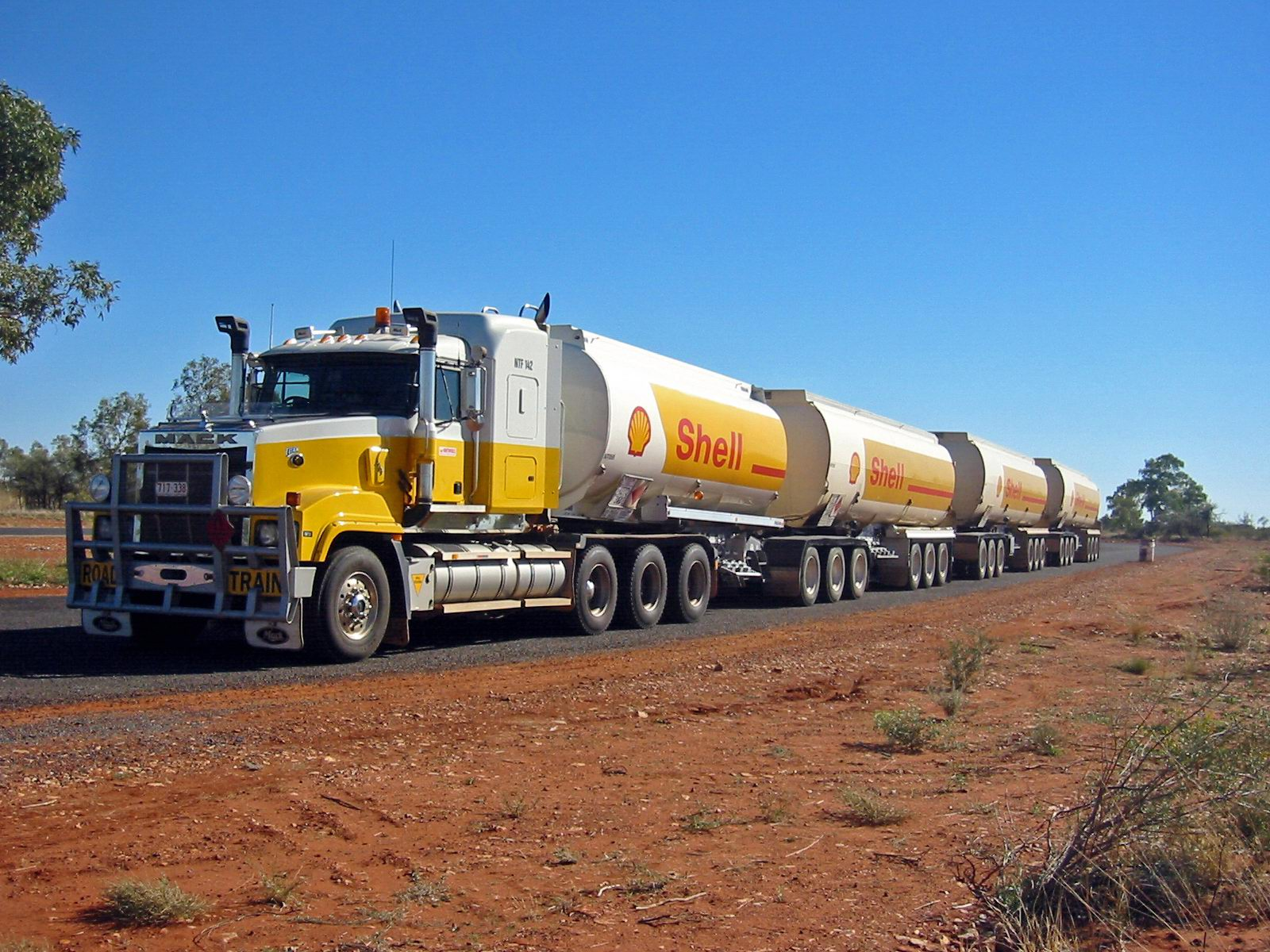
A Mack Titan in rural Australia

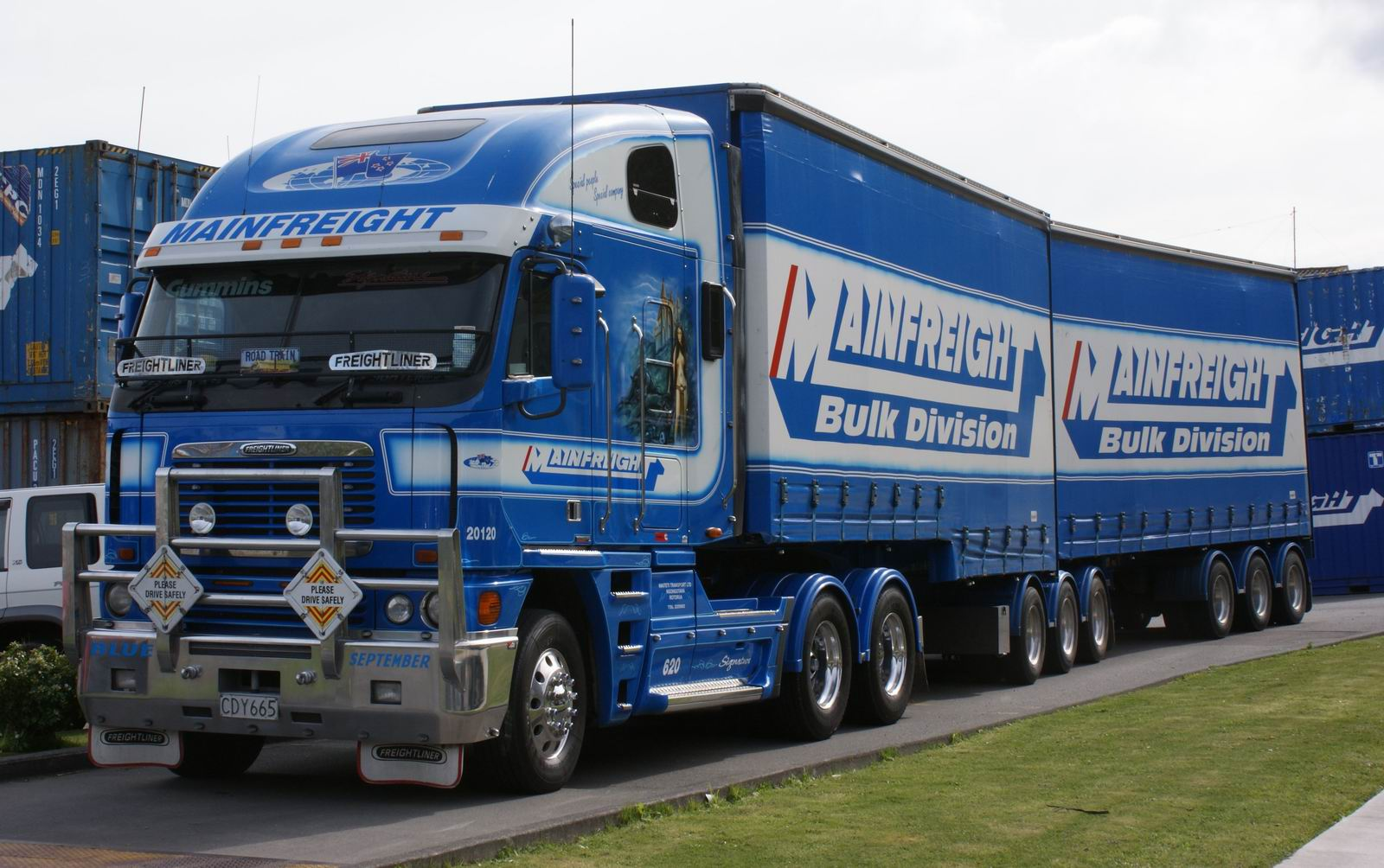
A pre-facelifted Freightliner Argosy in New Zealand

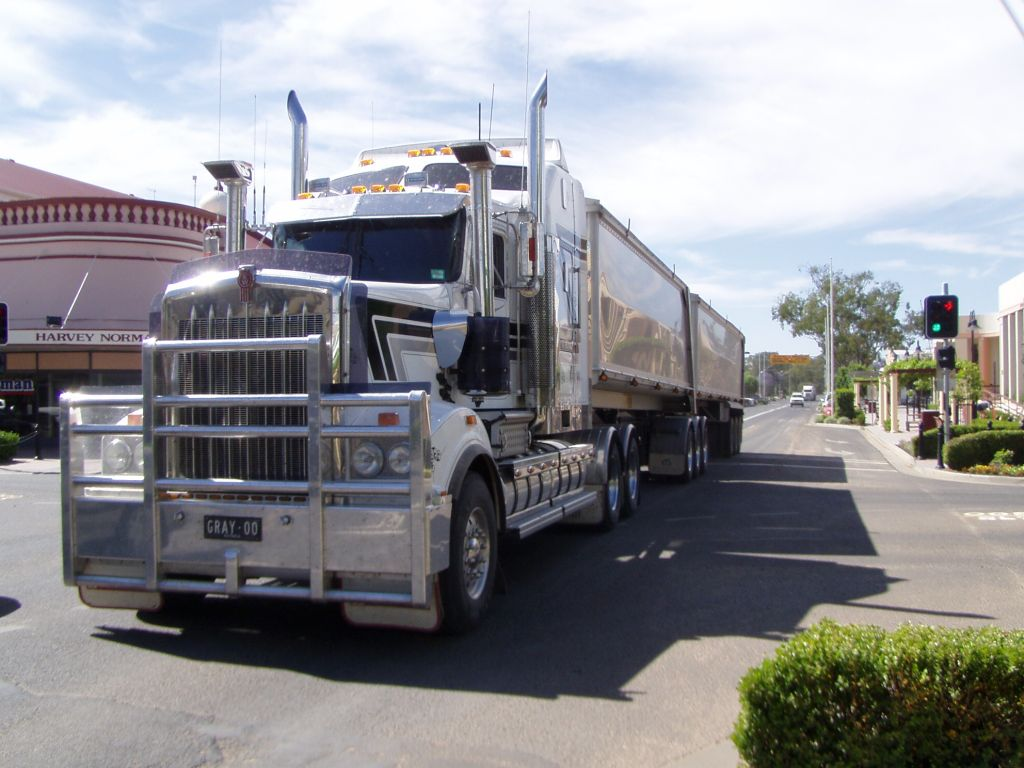
A Kenworth C509 in Australia
- Caterpillar Trucks
- DAF Trucks
- Freightliner Trucks
- Fuso
- Hino
- International Motors
- Isuzu
- Iveco
- Kenworth
- Mack Trucks
- Mercedes-Benz
- RFW
- Scania
- UD Trucks
- Volvo Trucks
- Western Star Trucks

== See also ==
- List of electric truck makers
- List of trucks
- List of pickup trucks

== Bibliography ==
- Commercial vehicles of Great Britain (PDF). Vol. 2. London: Goodrich Tyre. 1920 – via Revs Institute.
