= Vehicle Equipment Company =

Defunct American motor vehicle manufacturer

- Type: Truck Company
- Industry: Manufacturing
- Founded: 1900; 126 years ago
- Defunct: 1906; 120 years ago
- Headquarters: Long Island City, US
- Products: Trucks, Cars

The Vehicle Equipment Company of Long Island City, was a truck and car manufacturer.

== History ==
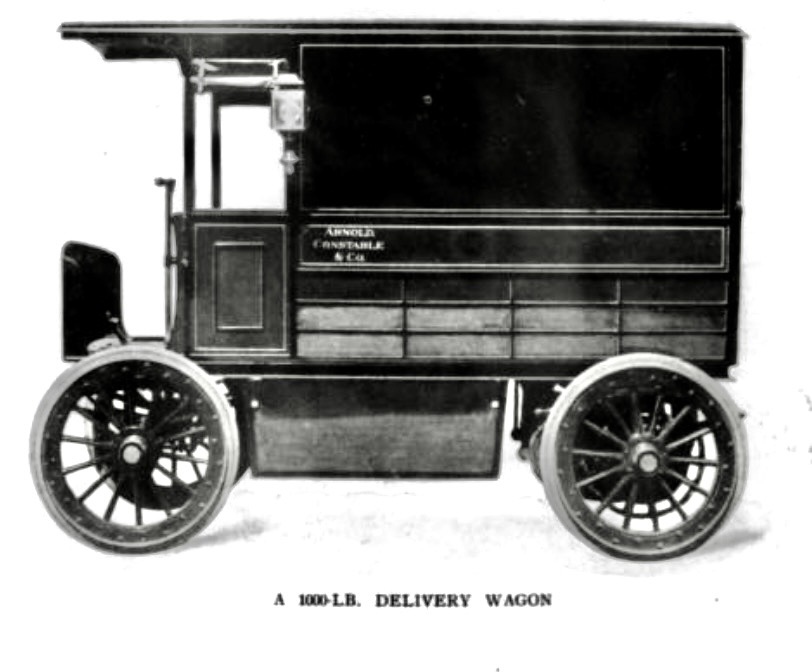
VE Delivery Wagon (1902) 0,5 to

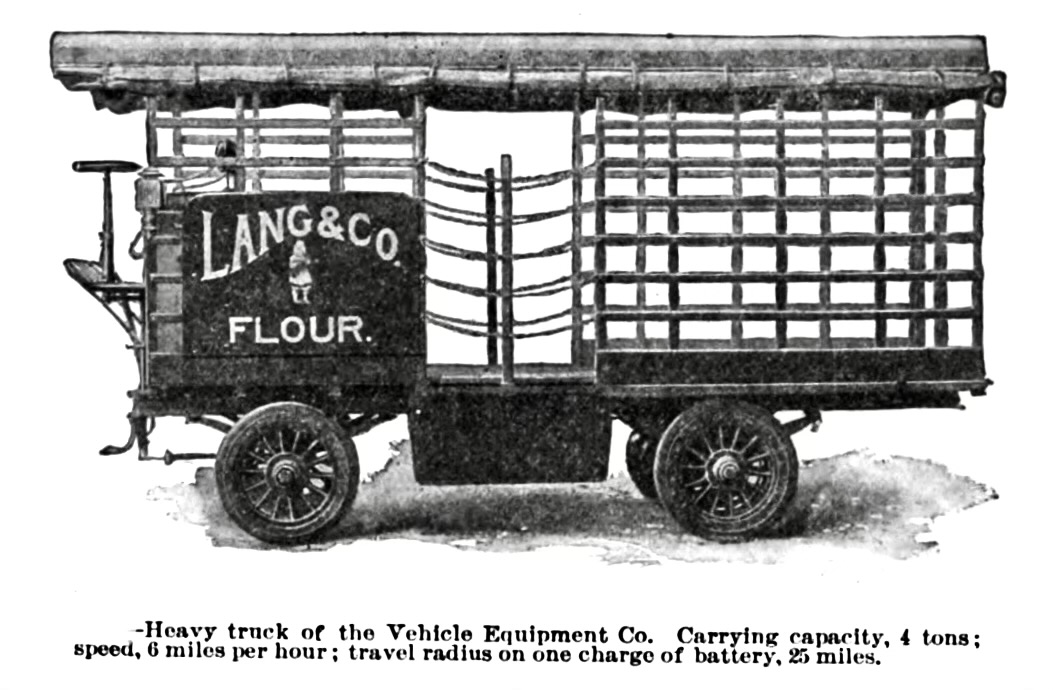
VE Vehicle Equipment Company 4 to truck (1905)

In December 1900, the company was founded in Brooklyn, a borough of New York City, by Arthur H. Havemeyer, Hector H. Havemeyer, and Robert Lloyd. In 1901, they started producing automobiles under the brand name VE. Sales were initially handled by John T. Rainier, until he founded the Rainier Motor Car Company in 1905. On July 5, 1904, a fire destroyed the factory. The company then moved to Long Island City, where production resumed in 1905. In a 1905 advertisement, Vehicle Equipment Company claimed to be the world's largest manufacturer of electric vehicles. In March 1906, it went bankrupt. The General Vehicle Company became its successor.
