= CNJ =

CNJ can refer to:

- The National Justice Council of Brazil, an administrative and oversight bidy
- Central Railroad of New Jersey, United States
  - Central Railroad of New Jersey 113, a locomotive
- The College of New Jersey, commonly abbreviated as TCNJ or CNJ, United States
- Camden New Journal, a free newspaper in the London Borough of Camden
- Chun Nan Jun, a Chinese auto manufacturer
- Cloncurry Airport, Queensland , Australia (IATA airport code "CNJ")
