= Pagefield =

Defunct British manufacturing company (1904–1966)

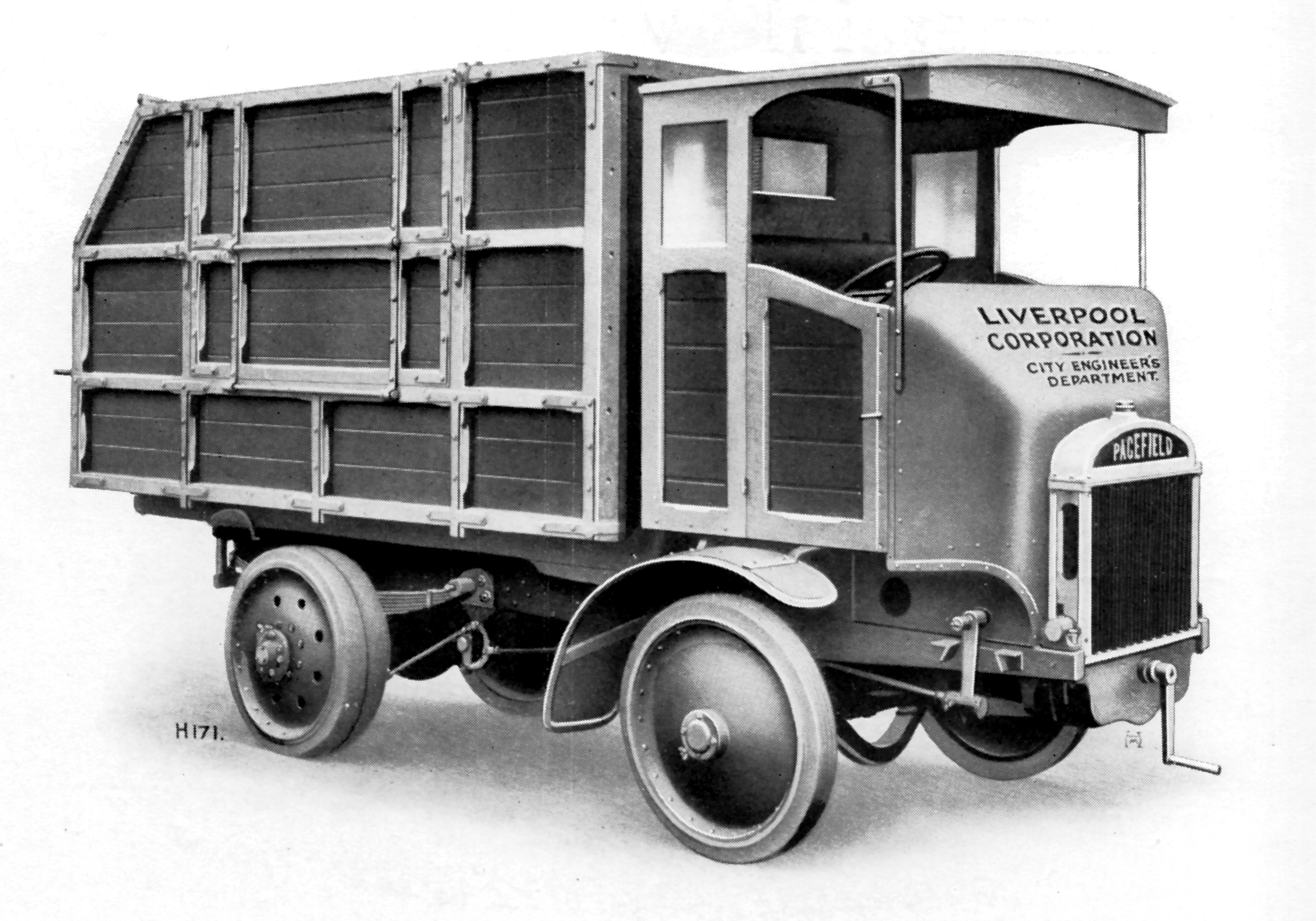
- Walker Brothers (Wigan) Ltd. Pagefield Iron Works
- Type: Privately held company
- Industry: Air Compressing Machinery, Vehicle manufacture
- Founded: England, 1904
- Defunct: 1966

Pagefield Vehicles was a British company manufacturing trucks and tipping gear. It was in business from 1904 to 1966, based with the Walker Brothers engineering firm at the Pagefield Iron Works in Wigan, Lancashire.

== History ==
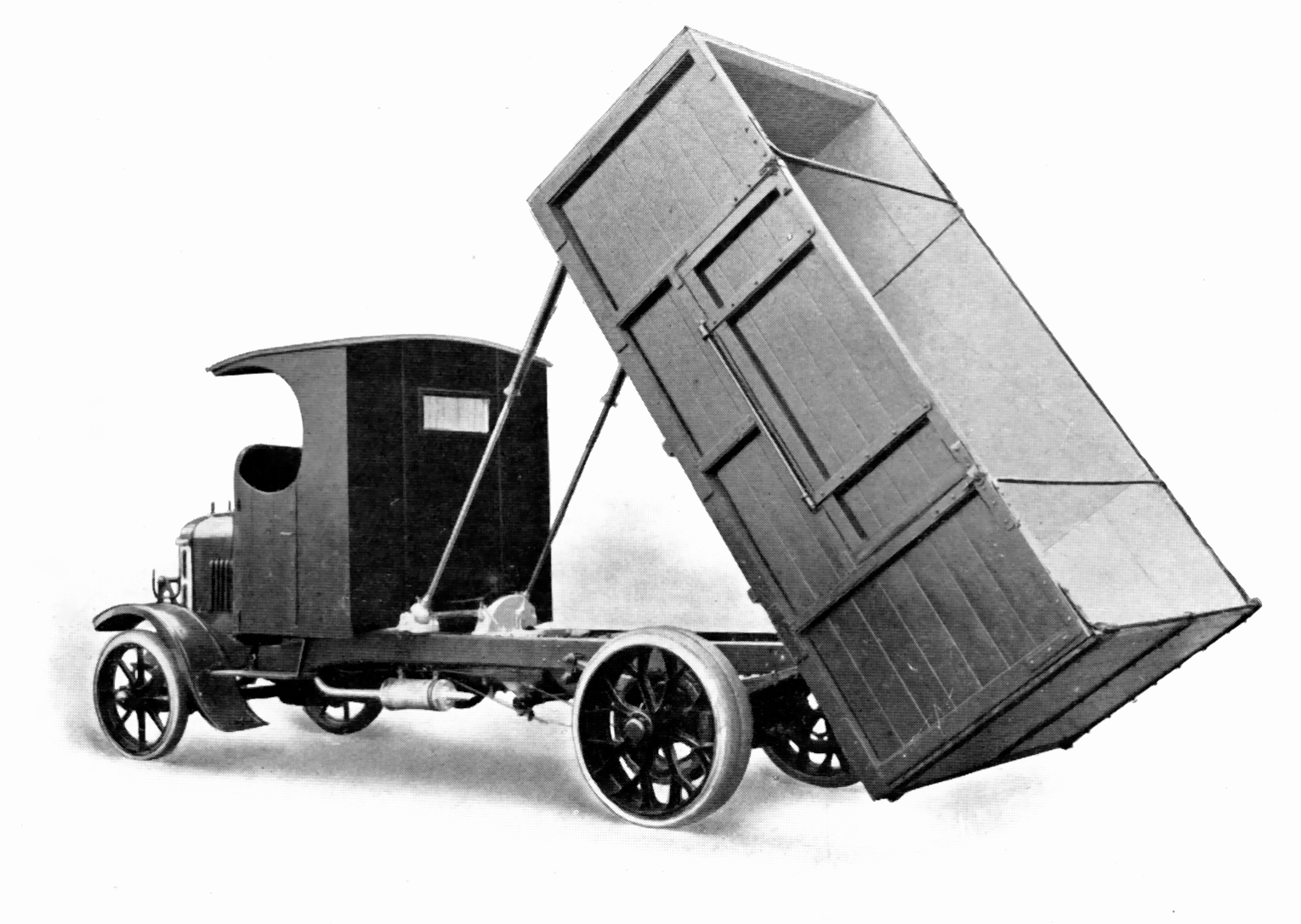
Pagefield Commercial Vehicle

The firm was established in 1904 as a general engineering company. In 1907 it produced 2-ton trucks. Between 1913 and 1931 it produced 4 ton trucks and 3.5 ton patented engine-operated tipping gear. A refuse collection vehicle of the 1930s, known as the "Pagefield Prodigy", featured a special short wheelbase chassis designed for operating in restricted spaces. 5-ton trucks were introduced in 1922, and 12-ton trucks, known as "6-trucks", in 1931.

In 1948, the company was reorganised and the name was changed to "Walkers and County Cars". The company ceased trading in 1966.

== See also ==
- List of truck manufacturers
