= American Coleman =

Line of semi trucks

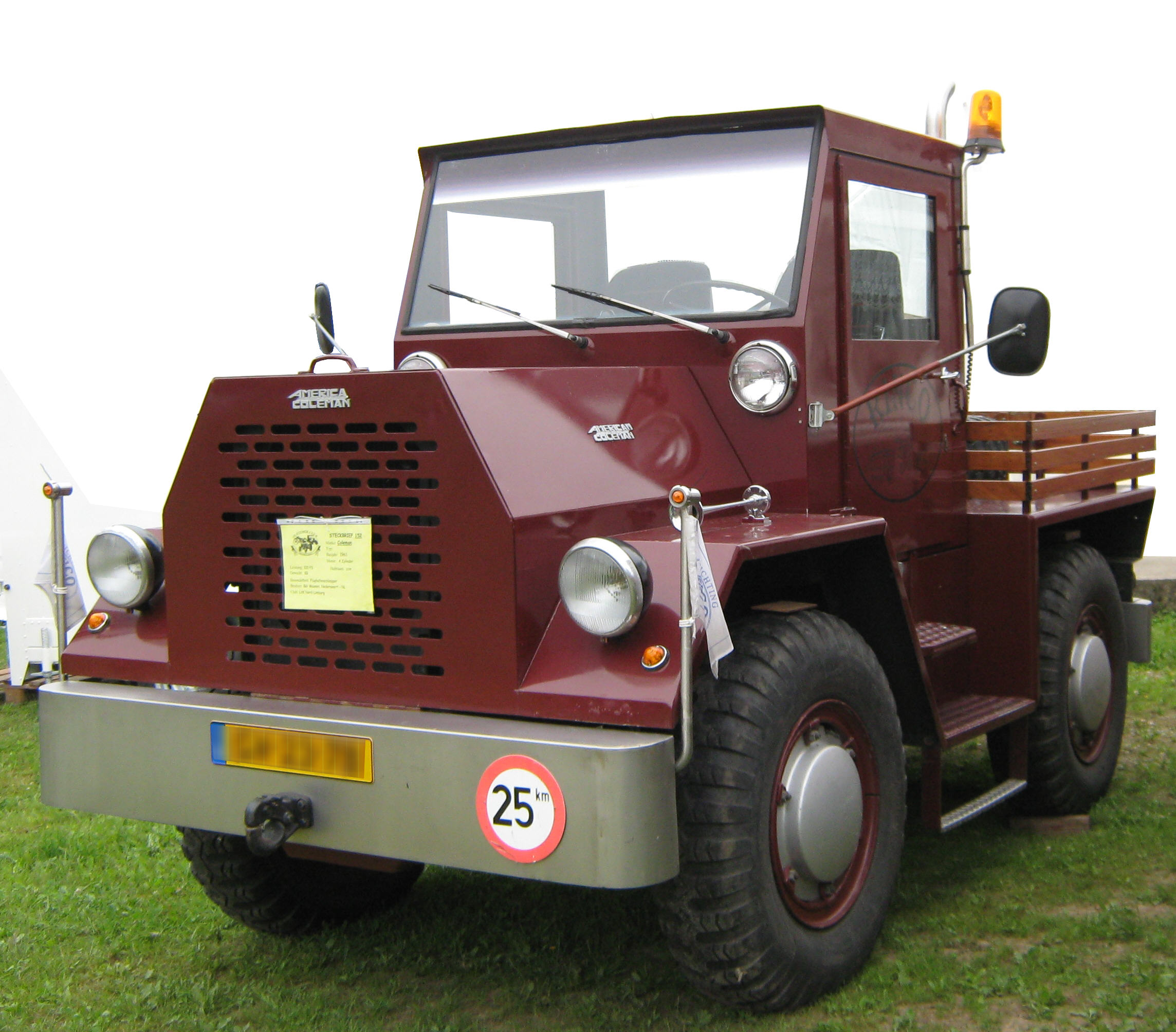

The American Coleman was a line of semi trucks built from the 1950s into the 1970s. The company is based in Littleton, Colorado.

This truck was used in airfield operations and military applications. The cab-over design had no fifth wheel; instead the truck's frame locked into position by eight pins. This made the trailer and tractor one unit. The truck had four single tires (no duals). The fuel economy was 6.5 mpg. The American Coleman semi truck was called the Space Star officially. This cab-over had two sleepers, one located just above the driver and the other behind the driver. Servicing the engine was simple: just roll it out on its own independent frame, much like a drawer rolls out of a desk. The Space Star ran for few years.
