= General Vehicle Company =

American truck manufacturer, 1907–1920

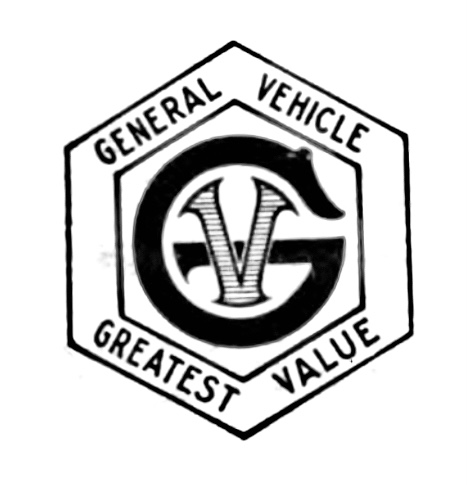
- Formerly: Vehicle Equipment Company
- Type: Truck and Car Company
- Industry: Manufacturing
- Founded: 1907; 119 years ago
- Defunct: 1920; 106 years ago
- Headquarters: Long Island City, US
- Products: Trucks ; cars

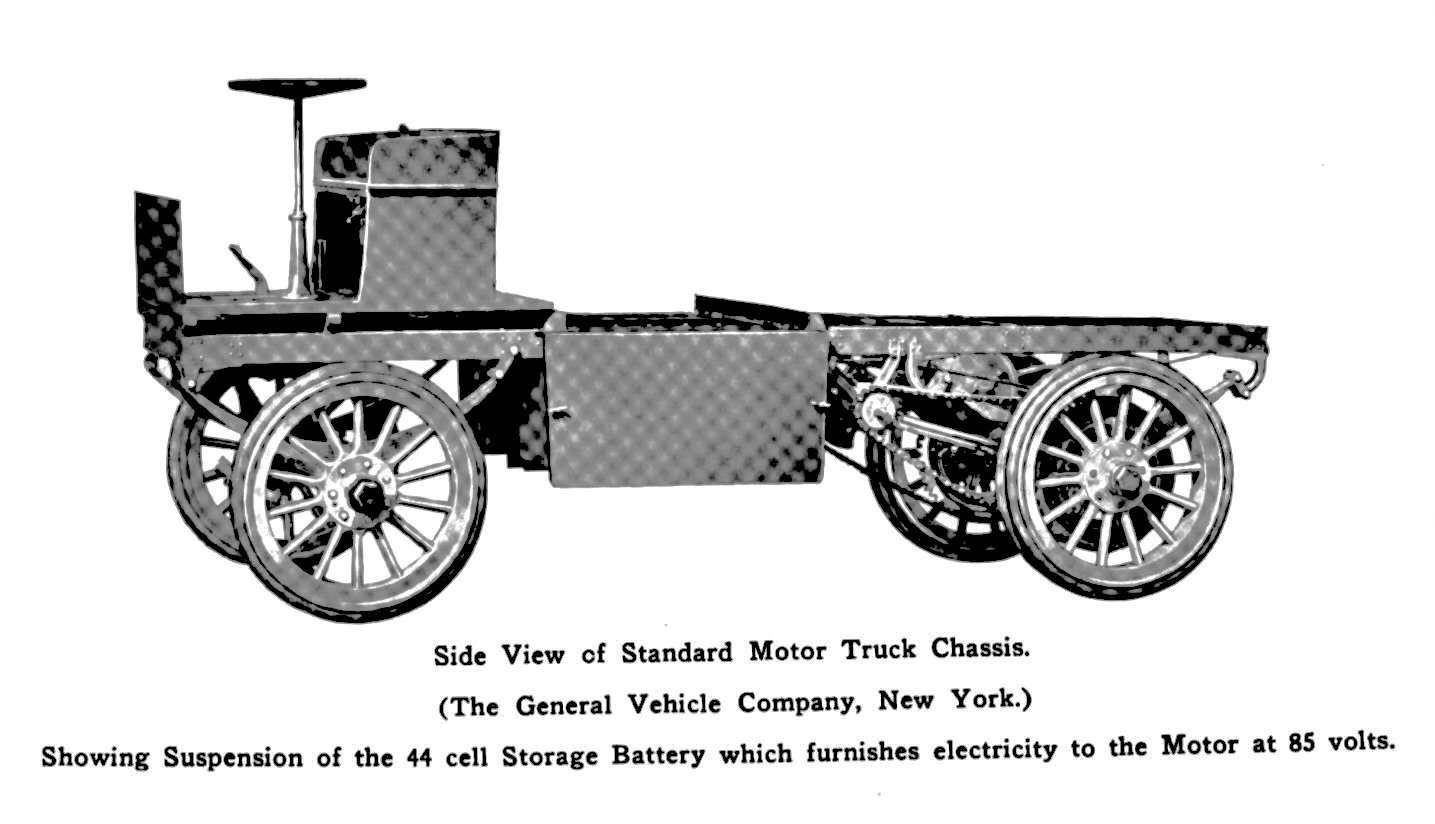
General Vehicle Company (1908)

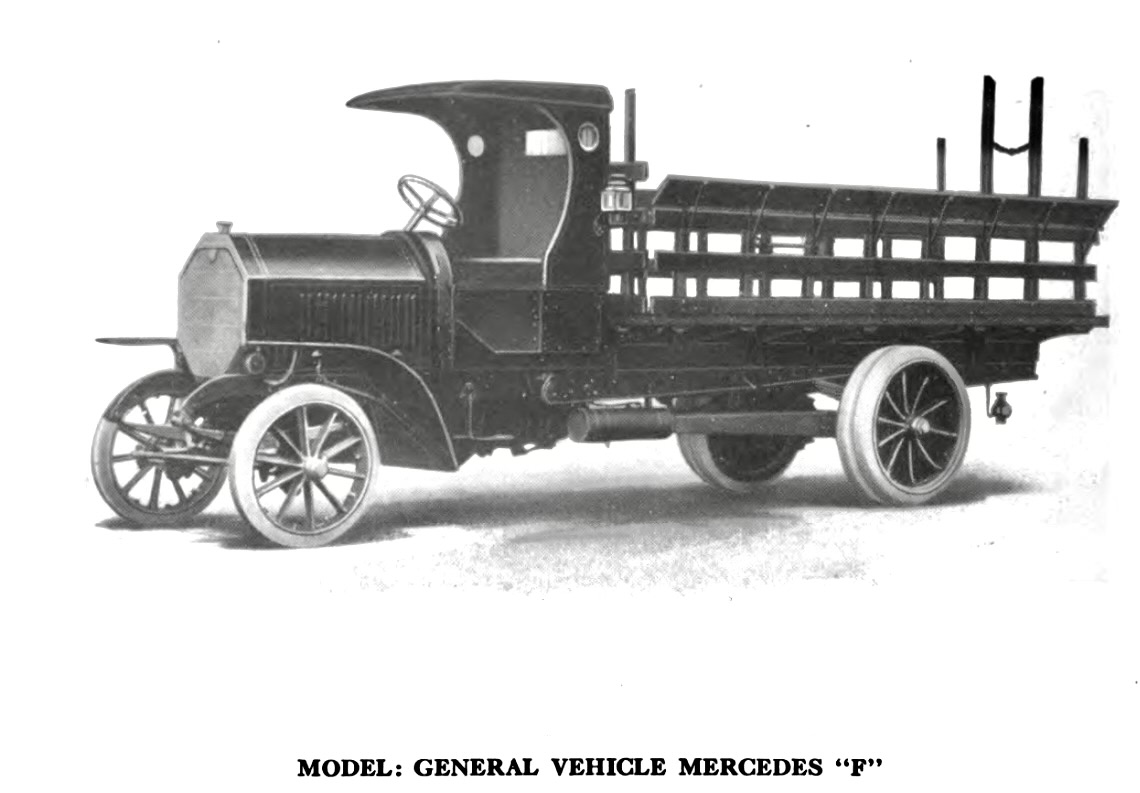
G.V. gasoline engine model F (1913-1918)

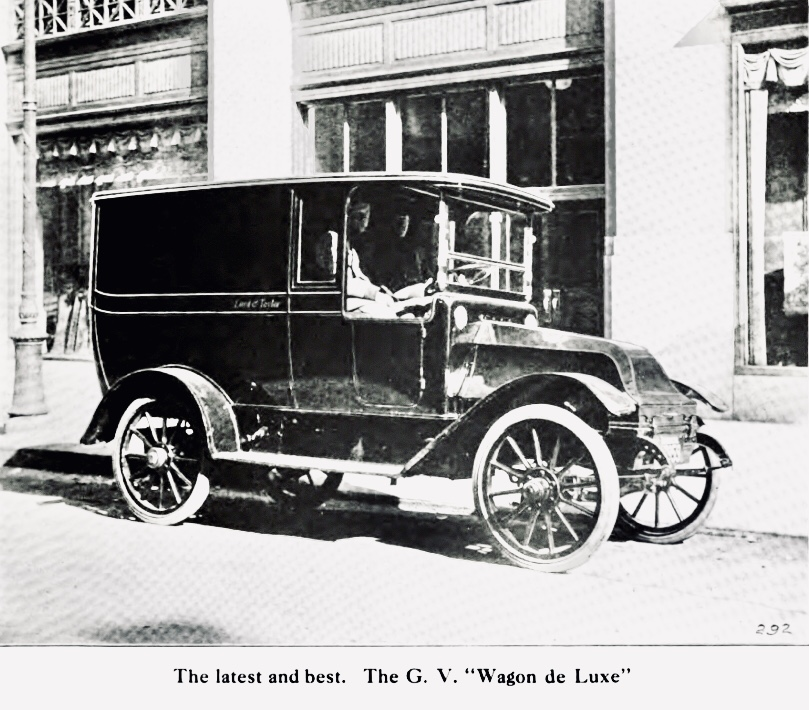
GV 0.5 t delivery van (1914)

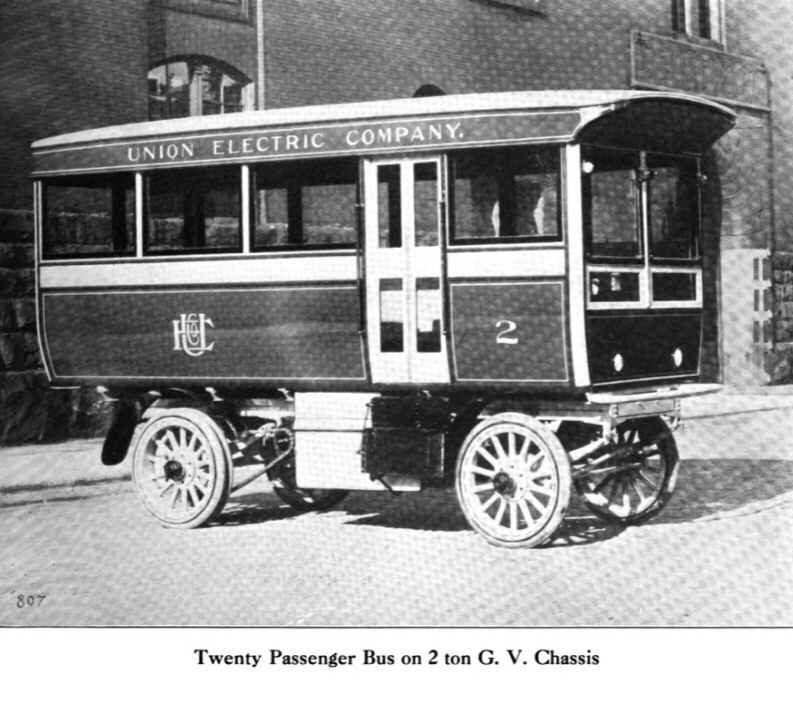
GV Bus 20 passengers (1914)

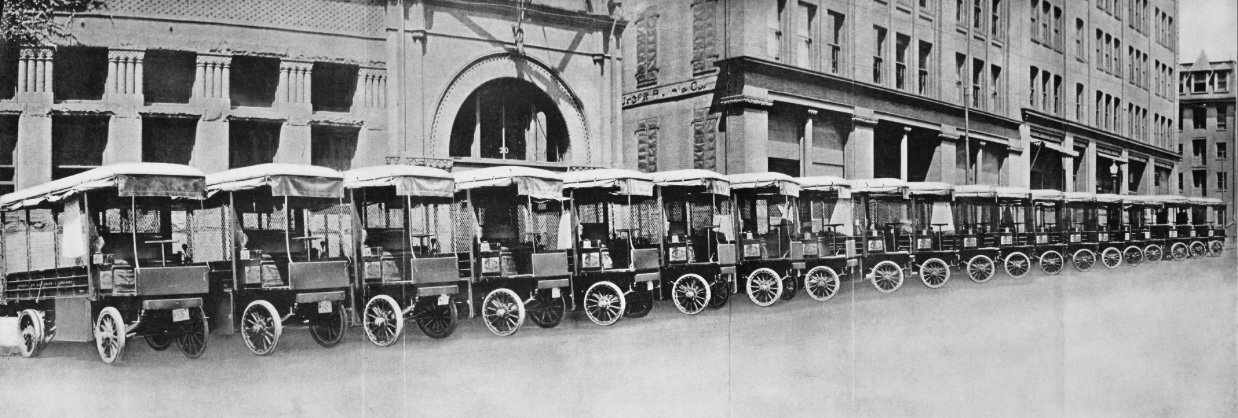
GV Trucks (1915)

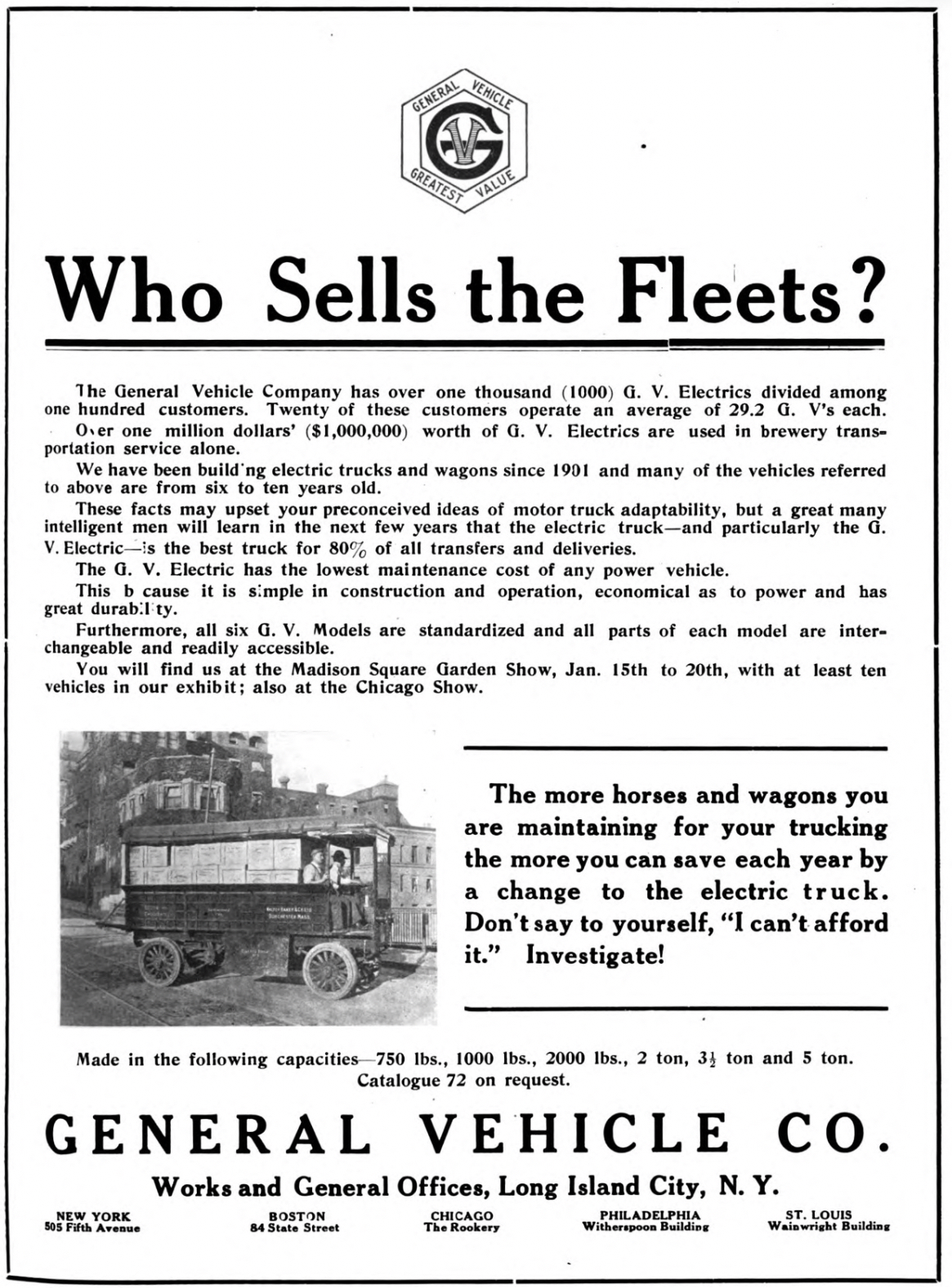
GV advertisement (1912)

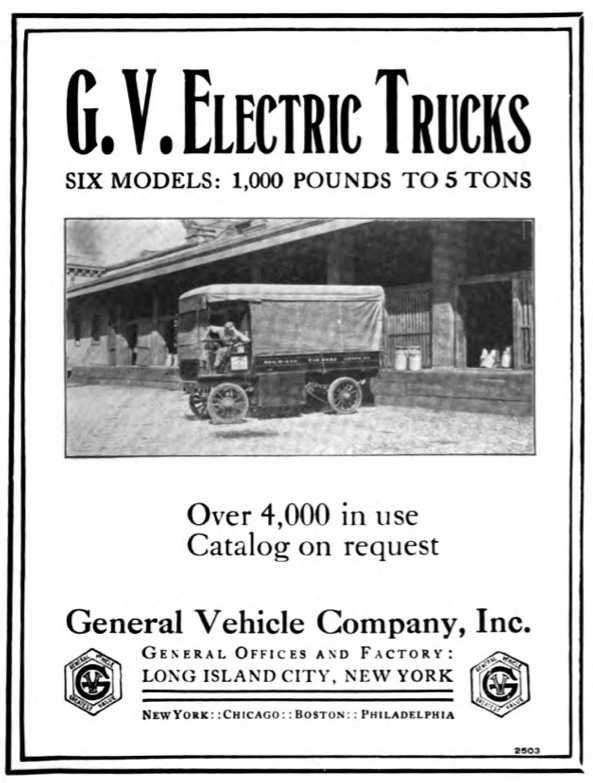
GV advertisement (1915)

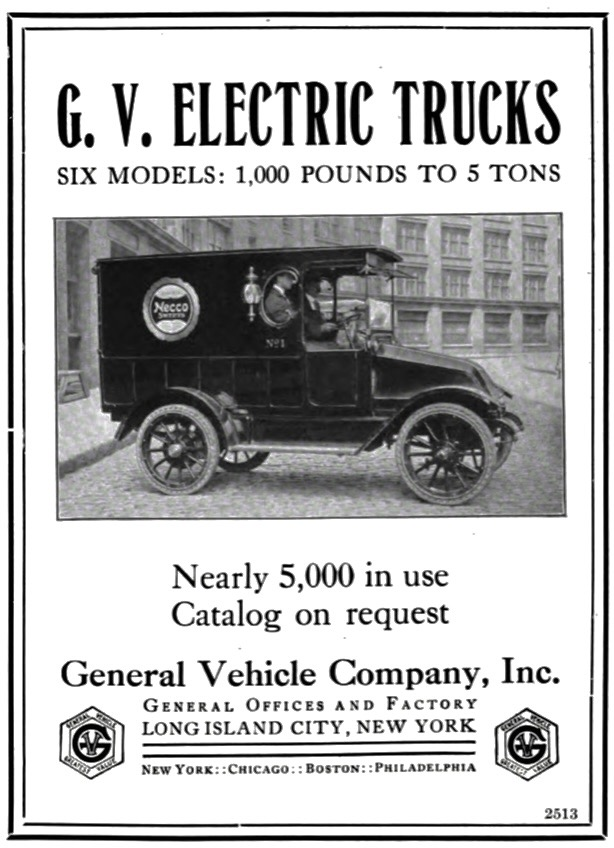
G.V. Electric Trucks advertisement (1915)

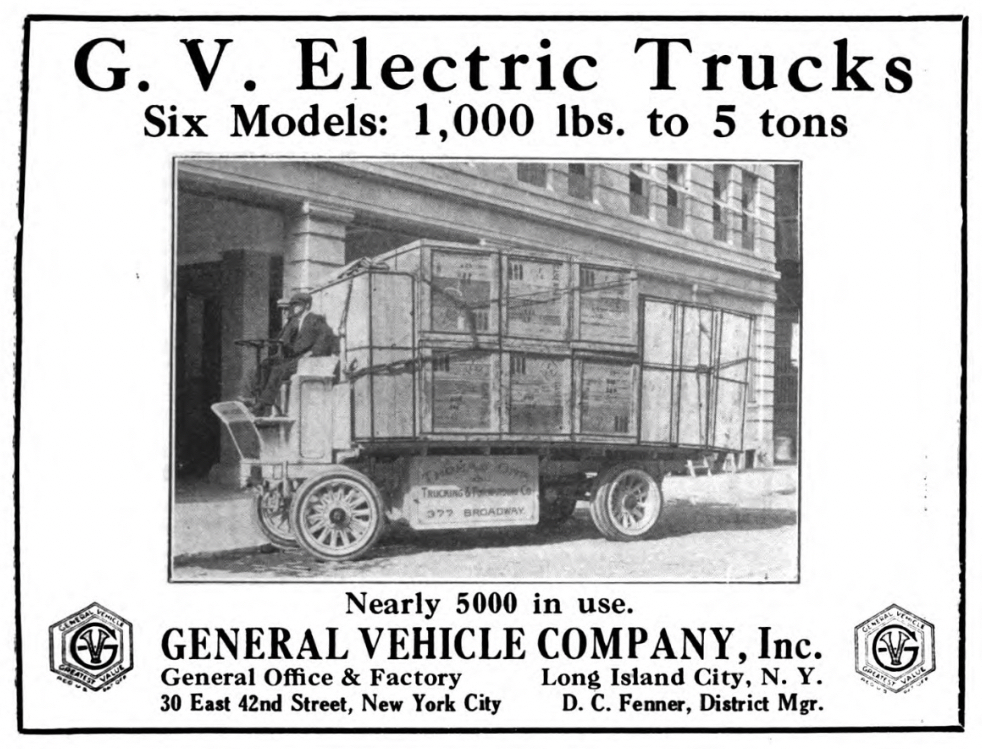
GV advertisement (1916)

The General Vehicle Company of Long Island City, was a truck manufacturer.

== History ==
The company was founded in 1907 in Long Island City, in the U.S. state of New York, as the successor to the Vehicle Equipment Company. The first vehicles were electrically powered passenger cars, and from 1908, commercial vehicles were also produced, also equipped with electric motors. The brand name was GV. Starting in 1913, trucks with gasoline engines were built under a license from the Daimler Motoren Gesellschaft, alongside they still-produced electric vehicles. In 1915, there was a merger with the truck division of the Peerless Motor Car Corporation. Production of GV vehicles continued until 1920. By the end of 1911, 1,000 vehicles had already been produced. The order situation for 1912 was good. In 1914, total production of 4,000 GV electric vehicles was exceeded. The production went to around 900 different customers, with the electric industry forming the main focus with around 25%, or 1,000 vehicles. In 1916, a production number of 5,000 vehicles was reached.

== Products ==
In 1913, six different models were produced.

In 1916

- GV Mercedes 6 t, $4.500
- GV 2t, $2.600
- GV 3.5 t, $3.250
- GV 5 t, $3.700

The pre-assigned serial numbers only indicate the maximum possible production quantity.

Year	Production figures	Wheel base	Load capacity	Serial number
(1901)	Vehicle Equipment Company			56
(1903)	Vehicle Equipment Company			303
1907	↓			1170
1908	↓			
1909	↓			
1910	↓			1897
1911	1,000			2131, 2252
1912	~ 1,000			2873
1913	~ 1,000			3545
1914	~ 1,000			3840
1915	~ 1,000			
1916		2261 mm	0,45 to	
		2642 mm	0,9 to	
		2858 mm	2 to	
		3366 mm	3,5 to	
		3594 mm	5 to	
1917				
1918				
1919				
1920				
