= Chun Nan Jun =

Chinese truck manufacturer

Ziyang Nanjun Automobile Co., Ltd.
- Trade name: CNJ Motors
- Company type: Public company
- Traded as: SSE: 600418
- Industry: Automotive
- Founded: 1958; 68 years ago (as Ziyang County Tractor)
- Headquarters: Ziyang, Sichuan, China
- Products: Trucks; Buses

Chun Nan Jun (CNJ) is the common name for the company also called Ziyang Nanjun Automobile Co., Ltd and Sichuan Nanjun Automobile Co., Ltd; it is a Chinese truck manufacturer based in Yanjiang, Ziyang, Sichuan, with over 3,200 employees. Ziyang Nanjun Automobile produces heavy, medium and light duty trucks and mini trucks as well as large, medium and light buses. Annual production capacity is 150,000 automobiles presently, ranking the 19th in China's auto industry and the second in China's commercial vehicle industry.

== Subsidiaries ==
Sichuan Nanjun Automobile Co., Ltd., produces public buses and highway passenger vehicles;

Ziyang Junxing Spare Parts Co., Ltd., produces spare parts;

Ziyang Ruiyu Logistics Co., Ltd., is mainly engaged in storage, logistics, property management and transportation of commodity vehicles;

Hunan Axle (Ziyang) Co., Ltd., produces axles annually for medium and light duty vehicles;

CNJ Automobile Chongqing Banglong Import & Export Co., Ltd., is the official corporate exporter.

== Joint ventures ==
In 2011 CNC signed a joint venture with Hyundai to produce Hyundai trucks and buses. Each entity would hold 50% of the JV named Sichuan Hyundai.

== Gallery ==
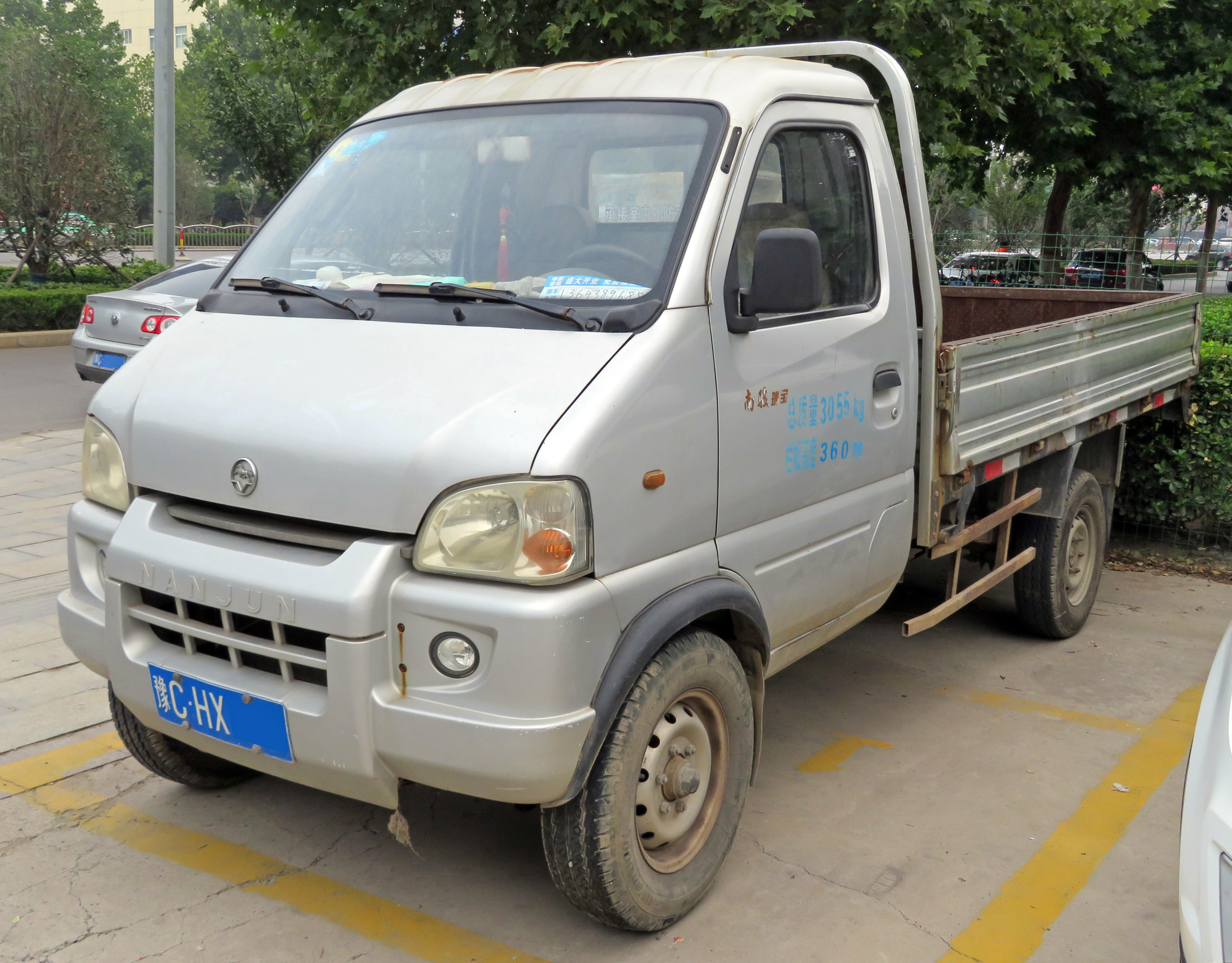
Sichuan-Nanjun Ruibao pickup truck

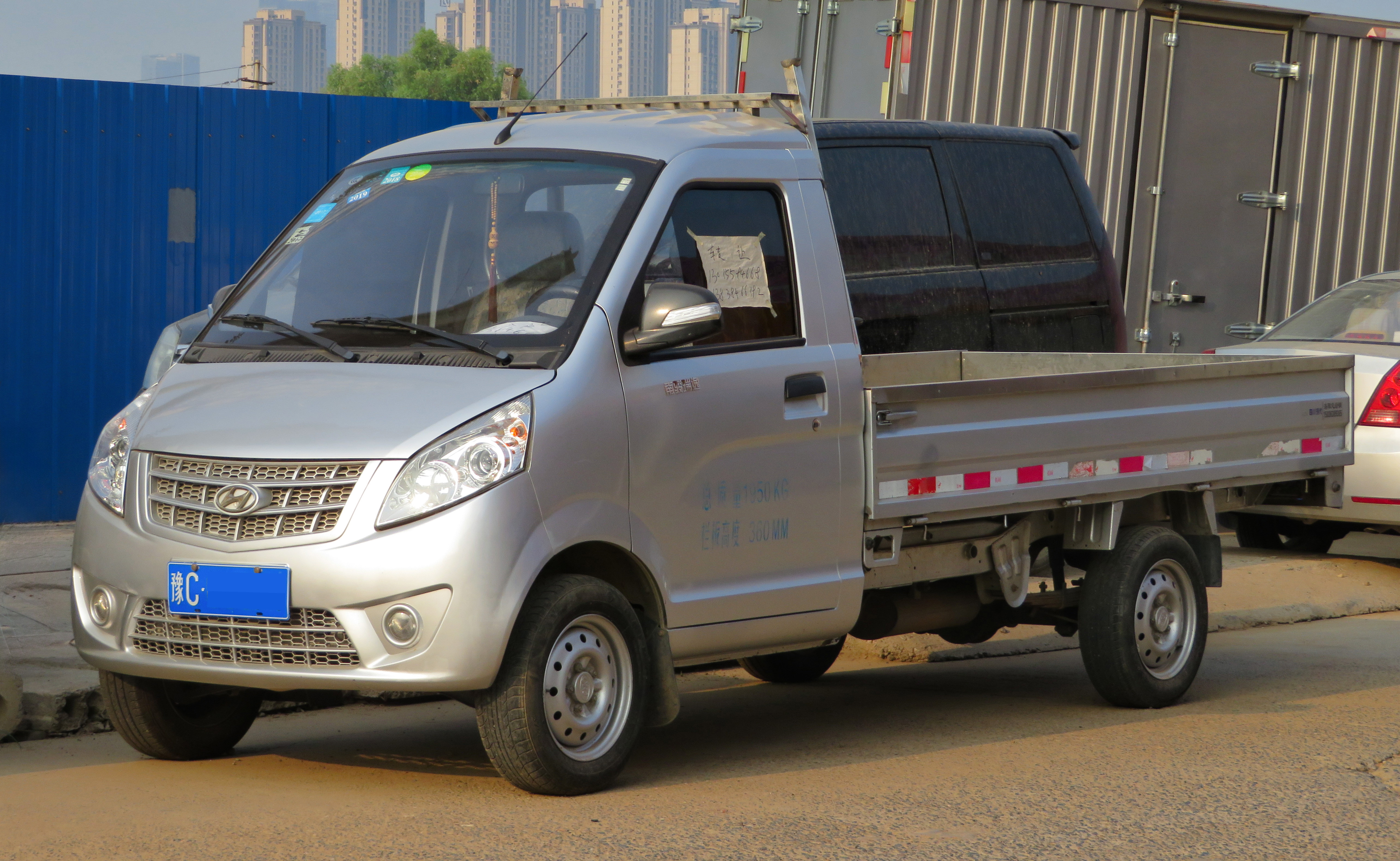
Sichuan-Hyundai Ruiyi pickup truck

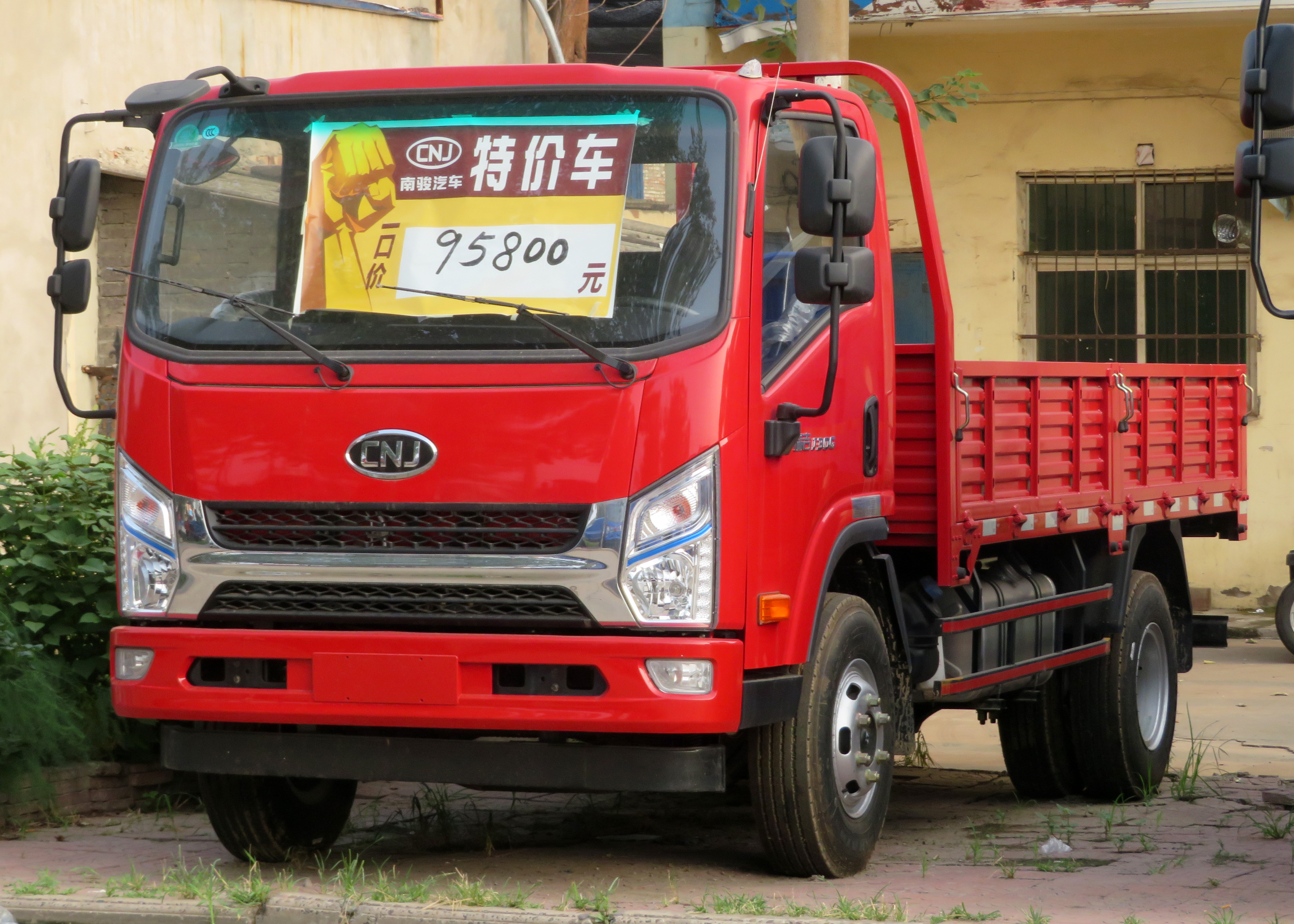
Sichuan-Nanjun Ruiji dump truck

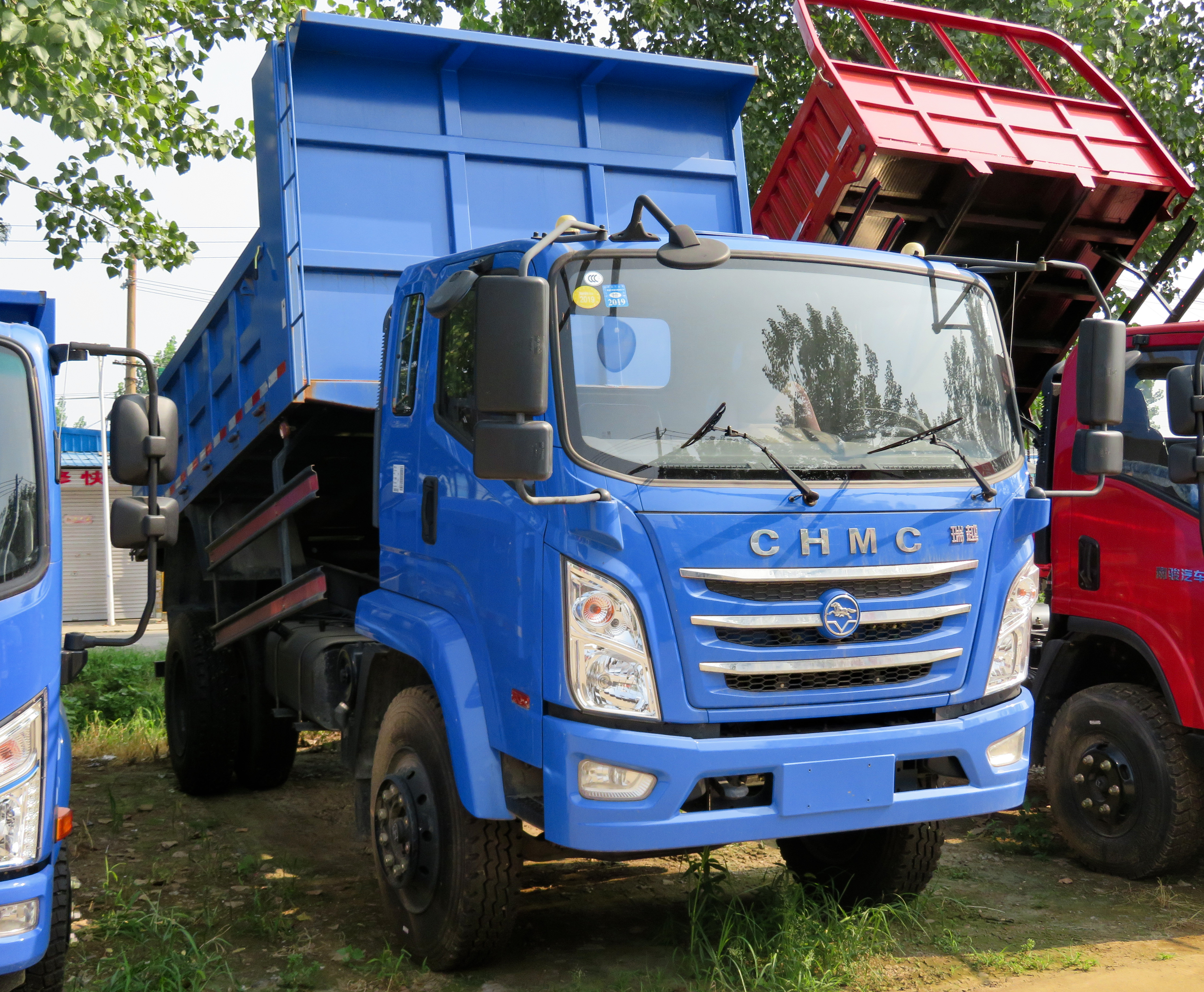
Sichuan-Hyundai (CHMC) Ruiyue dump truck
