= Continental Motors Company =

Defunct American motor vehicle manufacturer

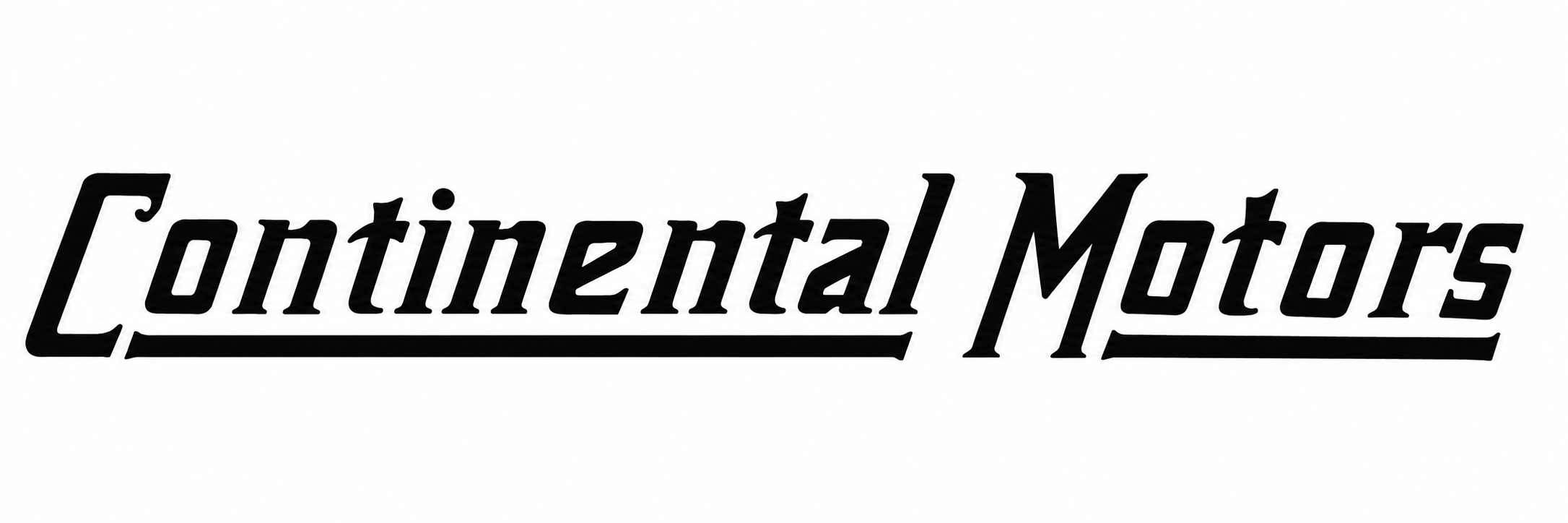
- Type: Public
- Industry: Engine manufacturing
- Founded: February 1905; 121 years ago in Chicago, Illinois
- Founder: Ross W. Judson; Arthur W. Tobin
- Defunct: 1969
- Fate: Merged with Teledyne Technologies
- Successor: Teledyne Continental Motors

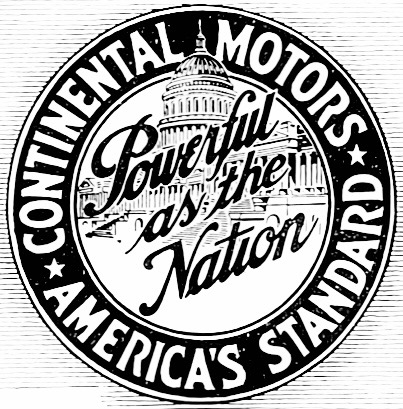
Continental logo

Continental Motors Company was a major American manufacturer of internal combustion engines, best known as an independent supplier of engines for automobiles, tractors, and trucks, as well as for use with stationary equipment such as pumps, generators, and industrial machinery drives. The company produced engines in the United States from 1905 through the 1960s. At its peak in the 1910s and 1920s, the company supplied engines to nearly 100 different automobile marques and powered an estimated three million cars.

Continental Motors also produced automobiles in 1932 and 1933 under the name Continental Automobile Company.

The Continental Aircraft Engine Company was formed in 1929 to develop and produce its aircraft engines; it became the core business of the successor company, Continental Motors, Inc..

In 1965, Ryan Aeronautical Company took over as a majority shareholder of Continental Motors and its subsidiary aircraft engine company. Later in 1969, Teledyne bought out Ryan Aeronautical as majority shareholder to merge. This merger became Teledyne Continental Motors.

== History ==
=== Origins and early development ===
The company was founded by engineer Ross W. Judson and his brother-in-law, businessman Arthur W. Tobin, in Chicago in 1902. Judson designed Continental's first commercial engine, an L-head four-cylinder, which debuted at the 1903 Chicago Automobile Show. Originally incorporated in September 1902, the company was named Autocar Equipment Co. In 1904, as the business rapidly grew, Judson and Tobin decided to focus on building engines instead of vehicles. This was then shortly renamed Continental Motor and Manufacturing Co. in February 1905 to avoid confusion with another automaker and to capitalize on the prestige associated with European engineering.

=== Starting in the auto industry ===
Continental first built a major plant in Muskegon, Michigan, in 1905, and later expanded to Detroit. Early customers included many "assembled car" manufacturers (i.e. independent automakers which purchased major components from suppliers rather than producing them in-house).

Continental became the dominant supplier of engines to independent and assembled carmakers, outproducing its chief rival, Lycoming, by more than two to one during its peak years. Customers included well-known marques such as Stutz, Hudson, Auburn, Peerless, Durant, and Kaiser-Frazer, among others. By the mid-1920s, Continental could produce up to 250,000 automotive engines annually.

=== Continental Automobile Company ===
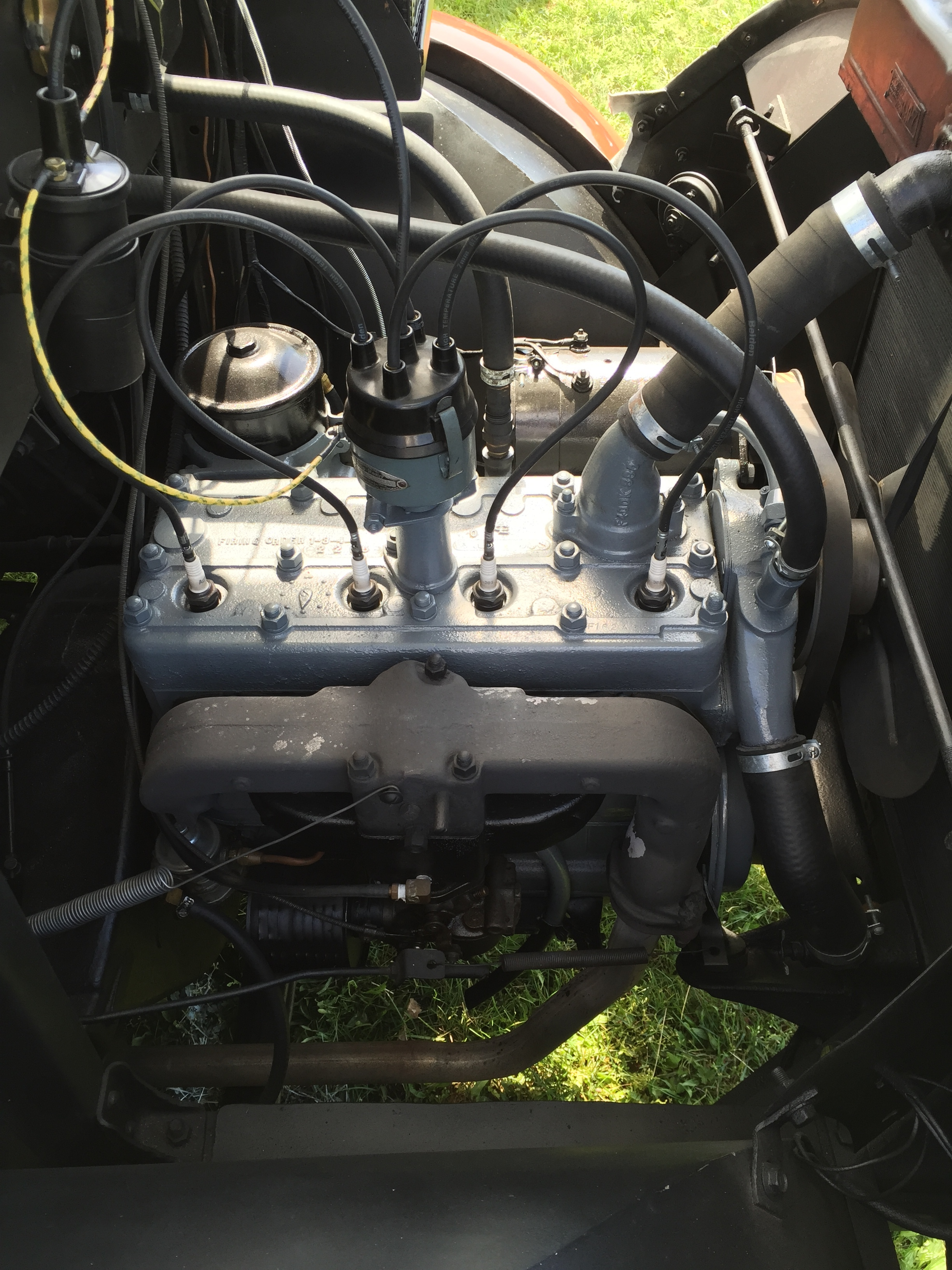
A Continental engine in a 1948 Divco delivery truck

Durant Motors extensively used the engines in its Star, Durant, Flint, and Rugby model lines. Following the 1931 collapse of Durant, a group having interest in Durant Motors began assembling its own cars, the De Vaux-Hall Motors Company, using the Durant body dies, in Grand Rapids, Michigan, and Oakland, California, and under the De Vaux brand name. When De Vaux-Hall collapsed in 1932, unable to pay creditors, Continental Motors assumed automobile assembly and marketed the vehicles under the Continental-De Vaux brand name for the balance of the 1932 model year.

Continental Motors introduced a completely new line of Continental-branded automobiles for 1933. These cars were not based upon the 1931 De Vaux, a product of the De Vaux-Hall, which had been using body dies left over from the former Durant produced by Durant Motors until 1930.

The 1933 Continentals were marketed in three model ranges: The largest and most expensive was the six-cylinder Ace; next was a smaller six-cylinder called the Flyer; the third was the low-priced, four-cylinder Beacon. The 1933 Beacon roadster was the lowest priced, full-sized car offered for sale in the United States in the 1930s, costing only US$335. None of these met with success in the Depression-era economy. At this same time, Dominion Motors Ltd. of Canada was building the same Flyer and Beacon cars under arrangement with Continental for sale in the Canadian market and importing the larger Ace models. Dominion then converted to building Reo brand trucks. The Ace and Flyer models were discontinued at the close of the 1933 model year. Finding that its cars were unprofitable, Continental stopped assembling even Beacon automobiles in 1934.

=== Aircraft and tank industries ===
In August 1929, the Continental Motors Company formed the Continental Aircraft Engine Company as a subsidiary to develop and produce its aircraft engines.

Continental was a major manufacturer of horizontally opposed "flat four" airplane engines and supplied a similar engine for Sherman tanks during World War II. Apparently, the United States government contracts continued during the Korean War. As the jet engine began to replace piston engine-powered airplanes, Continental began losing military contracts. The jet engine technology thus led to an understandable end to Continental's military prosperity. When the Korean War ended, Kaiser Corporation, which used Continental engines in all their vehicles, was able to gain ownership of a Continental engine factory. During that time of downsizing Continental's operations, many Continental employees dispersed to find jobs elsewhere in the industry; those engineers found new jobs at other companies, such as the newly formed American Motors, and even Chevrolet.

Kaiser, working with a Continental-designed engine, introduced the USA's first mass-produced overhead camshaft (OHC), inline six-cylinder engine. It debuted in Kaiser-owned Jeep Corporation vehicles in the mid-1960s. However, Stutz built both single- and dual-overhead cam inline six-cylinder engines in, respectively, the late 1920s and early 1930s (SOHC) and the early 1930s (DOHC). Moreover, these were fitted in Stutz production cars, though their numbers were comparatively small.

Particular models of John Deere tractor engines have been supplied by Continental since the ownership transfer to Korea, as stated on the tractor engine identification plates.

== Engines ==
=== Types ===
Continental built many engines for the US military, some by license, and many of unusual type.

Inline: Several conventional gasoline I6s were built for trucks, the COA331 (licensed from REO), 6602, 22R, and AO895 (also used in some armored vehicles). Later, the M-A-N-licensed multifuel LDS427, LD465, and turbocharged LDT465 were developed, also for use in trucks.

Radial: In the late 1930s, seven- and nine-cylinder, air-cooled radial aircraft engines were adapted for use in armored vehicles. The W670 and R975 were considered very reliable by the British in North Africa, but were not developed further.

Opposed: Just after WWII, an air-cooled O6 was developed for armored vehicles. AOS models were supercharged, while the AO-895-4 powering the M75 armored personnel carrier was not. The -3 and -4 models had carburetors, while -5 models had fuel injection with no increase in power, but better fuel mileage.

V type: In the early 1950s, an air-cooled V12 engine was introduced for armored vehicles. Later, the AVSI-1790 was developed into the AVDS-1790 diesel version, which was often retrofitted to earlier vehicles.

=== Use ===
==== Automobiles ====
These automobile companies used Continental engines:

- Abbott-Detroit
- Ace
- Anderson
- Apperson
- Auburn
- Bantam Reconnaissance Car(Y112 4 cyl. first Jeep during World War II)
- Barley
- Bay State
- Beggs
- Benham
- Bendix
- Birmingham
- Blackhawk
- Bour-Davis
- Bush
- Cardway
- Carhartt (automobile)
- Case
- Checker (pre-1965)
- Colby
- Columbia
- Comet
- Continental (see above)
- Corbitt
- Crawford
- Dagmar
- Darling
- Davis
- Detroiter
- De Vaux
- Diana
- Dodge
- DuPont
- Durant Motors, including:
  - Durant
  - Eagle
  - Flint
  - Star
- Economy
- Elcar
- Empire
- Enger
- Erskine
- Ferris
- Ghent
- Graham-Paige
  - Graham
- Hanson
- Hansa
- Hertz
- Hollier
- Howard
- Howmet TX (turbine race car)
- Huffman
- Imperial
- Jaeger
- Jewett
- Jones
- Jordan
- Kaiser-Frazer, including
  - Allstate
  - Frazer
  - Henry J
  - Kaiser
  - Willys (after 1953)
- Keller
- Kent
- Kenworthy
- Kleiber
- Kline Kar
- Lambert
- Leach
- Lexington
  - Howard
- Liberty
- Littlemac
- Locomobile
- Luverne
- Marendaz
- Marion-Handley
- Merit
- Meteor
- Monitor
- Moon
- Moose Jaw Standard
- Morris Cowley
- Morris (manf'd under licence)
- National
- Noma
- Norwalk
- O'Connor
- Ogren
- Overland
- Owen Magnetic
- Paige
- Pan-American
- Paterson
- Pathfinder
- Peerless
- Piedmont
- Playboy
- Ralf-Stetysz
- Reiland Bree
- Reo
  - Wolverine
- ReVere
- Roamer
- Rock Falls
- Romer
- Ruxton
- Saxon
- Sayers
- Scripps-Booth
- Severin
- S&M
- Stanwood
- Stephens
- Thorne
- Velie
- Vogue
- Walker
- Washington
- Wasp
- Westcott
- Windsor
- Woods
- Yellow

==== Motorcycles ====
- Indian (pre-1953 models)

==== Trucks and buses ====
- Acme Motor Truck Company
- Acorn Motor Truck Company
- AM General (medium and heavy trucks for military use)
- Atterbury Motor Truck Company
- Bessemer
- Biederman
- Brockway
- Columbia Motor Truck & Trailer Company
- Commerce
- Corbitt
- Denby
- Divco
- Federal
- GMC
- Indiana
- Kalamazoo Motors Corporation
- Maccar Truck Company
- McKeen bus for Minneapolis (only 2)
- Menominee
- Minerva
- Moreland
- NETCO
- Reo
- Republic
- Sterling
- Stewart
- Tiffin
- U.S. Motor Truck Company
- Wachusett
- Ward LaFrance Truck Corporation

==== Tractors ====
Some models used Continental engines for only part of their production lifespan; others used them exclusively.

- Allis-Chalmers Model G (Note: N-62: 62 cu in (1.0 L) gasoline 4 10 hp (7 kW))
- Allis-Chalmers Model U
- ATC TerraTrac
- Case Model VC
- Ferguson TE-20
- Ferguson TO-20 (Note: Z120: 120 cu in (2.0 L) gasoline I4 20 hp (15 kW))
- Ferguson TO-30
- Ferguson TO-35
- International 350 and Farmall 350 diesels (Note: D193: 193 cu in (3.2 L) diesel I4 39 hp (29 kW))
- Massey-Harris 44-6 and 101Sr
- Massey-Harris Pony
- Massey-Harris 33 (Note: D201: 201 cu in (3.3 L) diesel I4 40 hp (30 kW)) and 333 (Note: ED208: 208 cu in (3.4 L) diesel I4 42 hp (31 kW)) diesels
- Massey-Harris 50 / Ferguson F-40 (Note: Z134: 134 cu in (2.2 L) gasoline I4 33 hp (25 kW))
- Massey-Harris 81 (Note: F124: 124 cu in (2.0 L) gasoline I4 27 hp (20 kW))
- Oliver Super 44
- Some Silver King tractors
- Massey Ferguson 135

==== Other vehicles ====
(Vehicles often have engine changes during production and/or service life)

- Trucks
  - BRC (Note: BY4112: 112 cu in (1.8 L) gasoline I4 45 hp (34 kW)) ½ ton (227 kg) 4x4
  - M35 series (Note: COA331: 331 cu in (5.4 L) gasoline I6 146 hp (109 kW)) (Note: LDS427: 427 cu in (7.0 L) multifuel I6) (Note: LDS/LDT465: 478 cu in (7.8 L) multifuel I6 175 hp (130 kW)) 2 ½ ton (2268 kg) 6x6
  - M54 series (Note: R6602: 602 cu in (9.9 L) gasoline I6) 5 ton (4536 kg) 6x6
  - G116 (Note: 22R: 501 cu in (8.2 L) gasoline I6 145 hp (108 kW)) 10 ton (9272 kg) 6x6
  - M249 and 250 (Note: AO895: 895 cu in (14.7 L) gasoline O6 295–375 hp (220–280 kW)) tractors 4x4
    (for “Atomic Cannon”)
- Gun motor carriages and tractors
  - M5 (Note: R6572: 572 cu in (9.4 L) gasoline 6 207 hp (154 kW)) 13 ton (11793 kg) tractor
  - M7 (Note: R975: 973 cu in (15.9 L) gasoline R9 400 hp (298 kW)) 105 mm howitzer
  - M8 (Note: AO/AOSI895: 895 cu in (14.7 L) gasoline O6 500 hp (373 kW)) 16 ton (14515 kg) tractor
  - M12 155 mm gun
  - M18 76 mm AT gun
  - M40 155 mm gun
  - M42 (Note: AOSI895: 895 cu in (14.7 L) fuel-injected gasoline O6 500 hp (373 kW)) 40 mm (x2) AA gun
  - M43 8 in (203 mm) howitzer
  - M44 155 mm howitzer
  - M52 105 mm howitzer
  - M53 (Note: AV1790: 1,790 cu in (29.3 L) gasoline V12 810 hp (604 kW)) 155 mm gun
  - M55 8 in (203 mm) howitzer
- Landing vehicles and carriers
  - LVT(A)(1), (2), and (A)(2) (Note: W670: 668 cu in (10.9 L) gasoline R7 262 hp (195 kW))
  - LVT (4), (A)(4), and (A)(5)
  - LVPT 5 (Note: AVSI1790: 1,790 cu in (29.3 L) gasoline V12 1,020 hp (761 kW))
  - M75 Armored personnel carrier
  - M76 (Note: AOI268: 269 cu in (4.4 L) gasoline O4 707 hp (527 kW)) 1 ½ ton (1361 kg) carrier
- Tanks
  - M3 light (37 mm gun)
  - M3 medium (75 mm gun)
  - M4 medium (75 mm/76 mm gun)
  - M41 light (76 mm gun)
  - M47 (Note: AVSI1790: 1,790 cu in (29.3 L) fuel-injected gasoline V12 1,020 hp (761 kW)) medium (90 mm gun)
  - M48 medium (90 mm/105 mm gun)
  - M60 (Note: AVDS1790: 1,790 cu in (29.3 L) diesel V12 1,020 hp (761 kW)) medium (105 mm gun)
  - M103 heavy (120 mm gun)
- Armored recovery vehicles
  (tank chassis / winch capacity)
  - M31(M3 / 60,000 lb (27,000 kg))
  - M32 (M4 / 60,000 lb (27,000 kg))
  - M51 (M103 / 90,000 lb (41,000 kg))
  - M88 (M48 / 90,000 lb (41,000 kg))
