= Hanson (automobile company) =

Defunct American motor vehicle manufacturer

The Hanson Motor Company was founded in December 1917 in Atlanta, Georgia by George W. Hanson and Don M. Ferguson and lasted until 1925.

== History ==
In 1907, George Hanson opened a bike shop in Griffin, Georgia, and soon began selling Franklin motor cars. During the mid-teens, he came up with an idea to make a small, low-priced car for the South. With the help of Don Ferguson, Hanson tore apart a Packard touring car for ideas, and in February 1917 began plans to manufacture the first Hanson car at a factory in Detroit, Michigan although manufacturing was delayed due to the first World War. After the U.S. government released the factory from war production in June 1918, the first Hanson car was produced—a 5-passenger tourer with a Continental 7R six-cylinder engine in it. "Tested and Proved in the South" was one of the company's slogans, along with "Made in Dixie" (even though the factory was in Detroit, the headquarters were in Atlanta). In 1921, Hanson toyed with a torque converter but never made one. When the post war recession hit, Hanson was forced to slash prices. A Little Six was introduced at the bargain basement price of $995. In 1925, he closed the doors to his factory. A total of 1,800 cars are believed to have been made with the majority of them being sold in Atlanta and other parts of Georgia. George Hanson then turned to the manufacture of baby nursing bottles and returned to Atlanta in the mid-1930s to become a life insurance agent. He died in 1940 at age 65.

=== Models ===
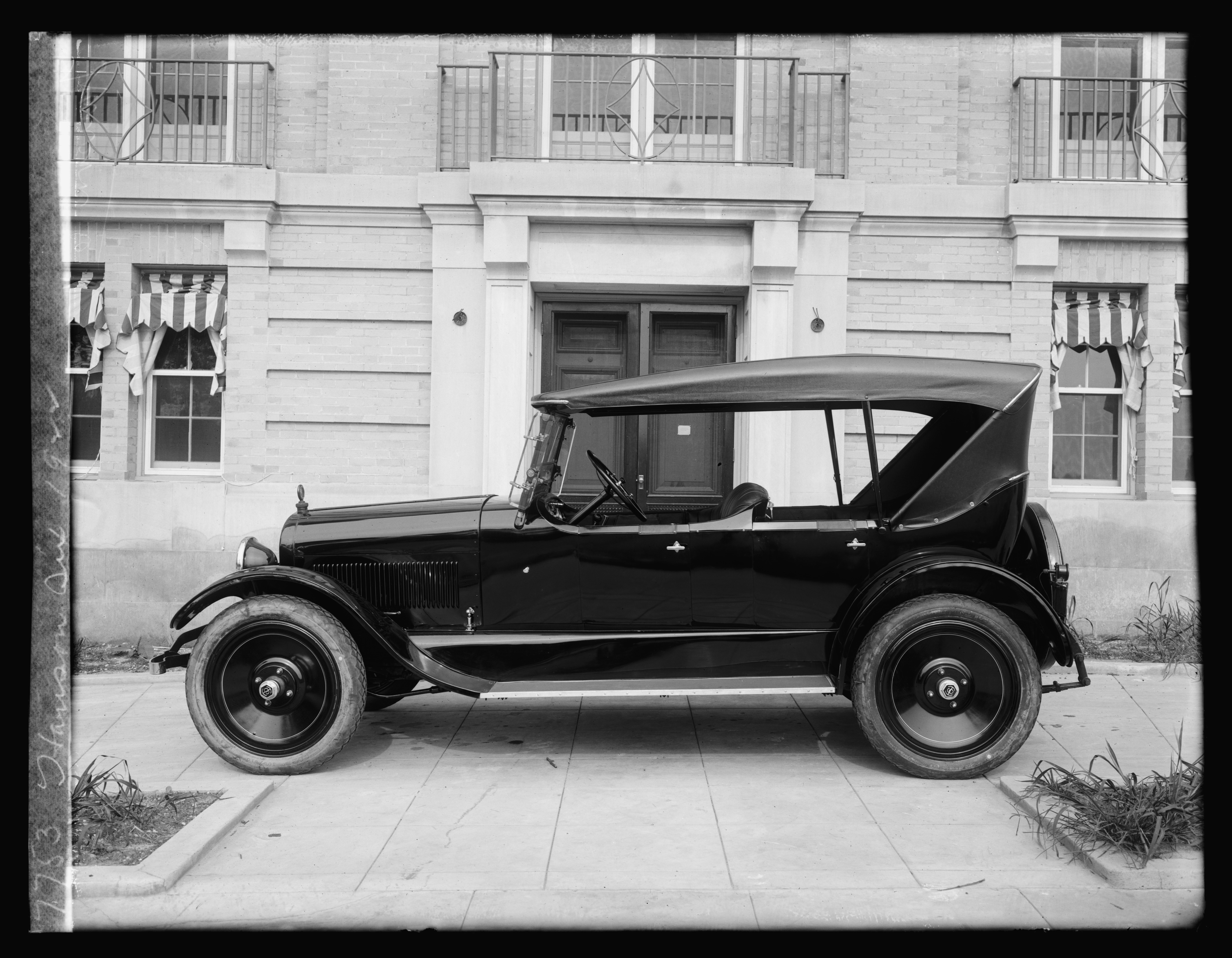
Hanson Six, 1922

| Model/Year | engine | HP | Wheelbase |
|---|---|---|---|
| 1918–1919 | Six-Cylinder | 45 | 119" |
| 1920 (Touring, Roadster, Sedan) | Six-Cylinder | 55 | 121" |
| 1921 | Six-Cylinder | 55 | 121" |
| Little Six (1922) | Six-Cylinder | 50 | 112" |
| 1922 | Six-Cylinder | 55 | 121" |
| Special Six (1923) | Six-Cylinder | 50 | 115" |
| 1923 | Six-Cylinder | 66 | 121" |
| 1924–1925 | Six-Cylinder | 66 | 121" |
