= Maccar Truck Company =

Defunct American motor vehicle manufacturer

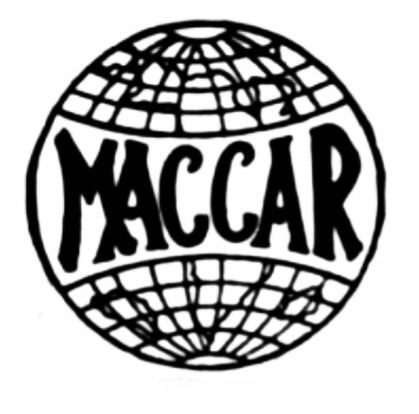
- Formerly: Mac-Carr Co. (1912-1913) Allentown, Pennsylvania
- Type: Truck Company
- Industry: Manufacturing
- Founded: 1912; 114 years ago
- Founder: Jack Mack (one of the brothers who formed MACK in 1902) and Roland Carr
- Defunct: 1935; 91 years ago
- Successor: Maccar-Selden-Hahn Corp. (1929-1935) Allentown, Pennsylvania
- Headquarters: Scranton, Pennsylvania, US
- Products: Trucks

The Maccar Truck Company of Scranton, Pennsylvania, was a truck manufacturer.

== History ==
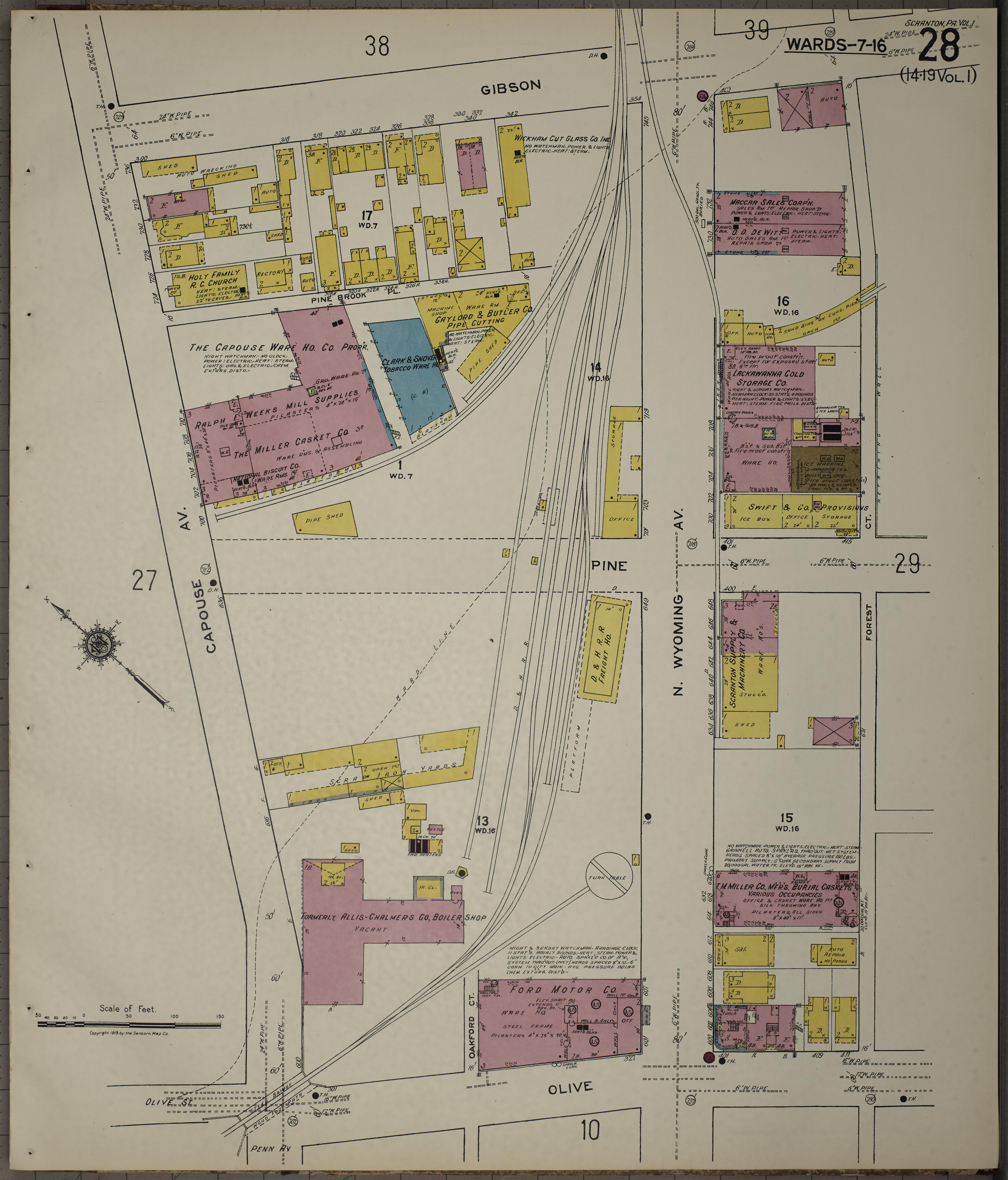
Maccar salesroom (1919) at N. Wyoming Av. Scranton

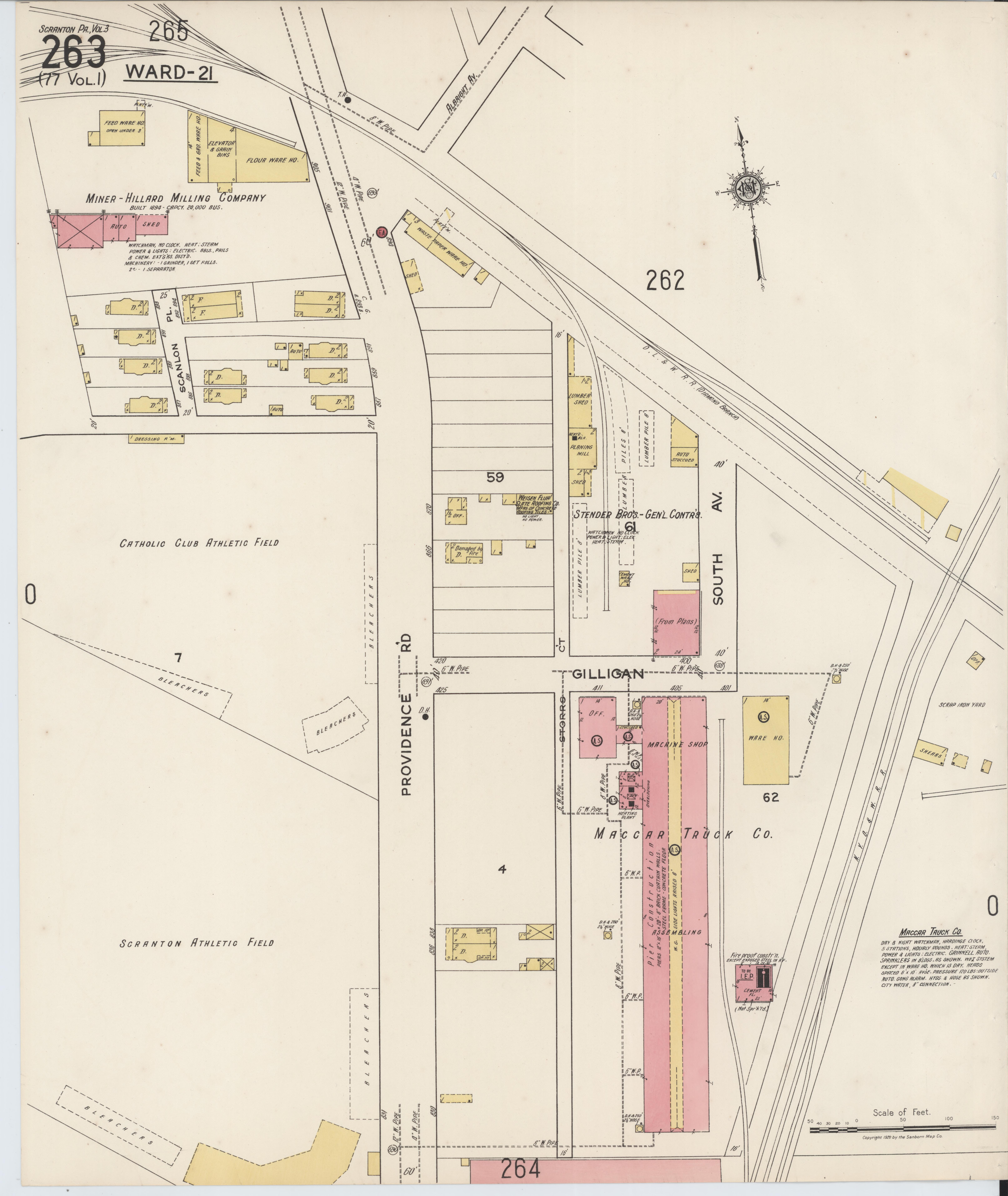
Maccar plant (1920) at Gilligan South Av. Scranton

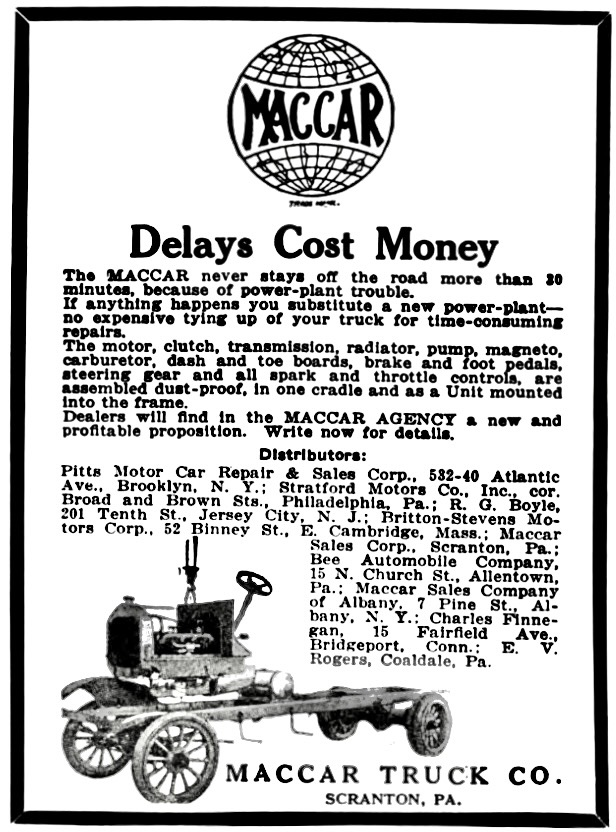
Maccar advertisement (1917)

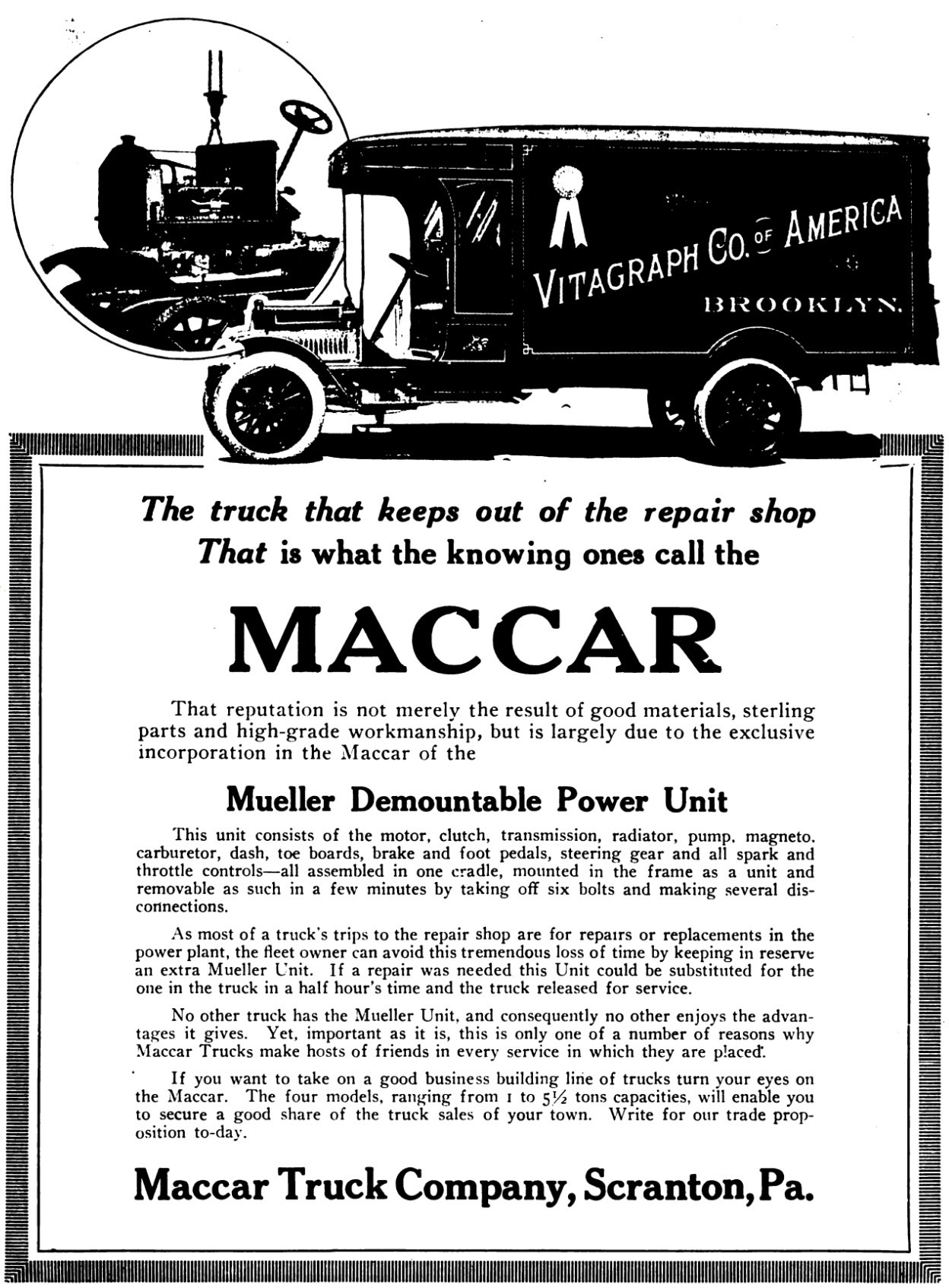
Maccar Mueller Unit (1917)

Maccar Mueller plant (1917)

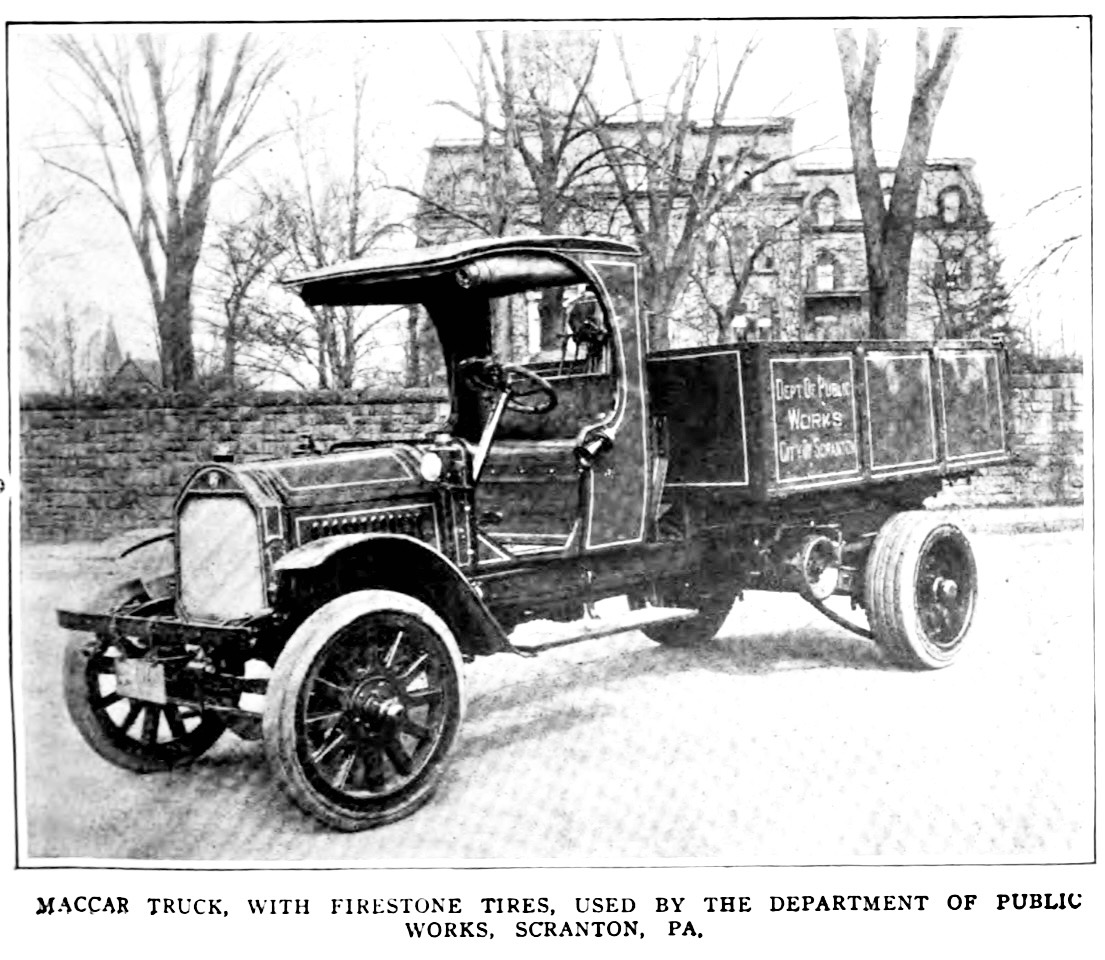
Maccar (1917)

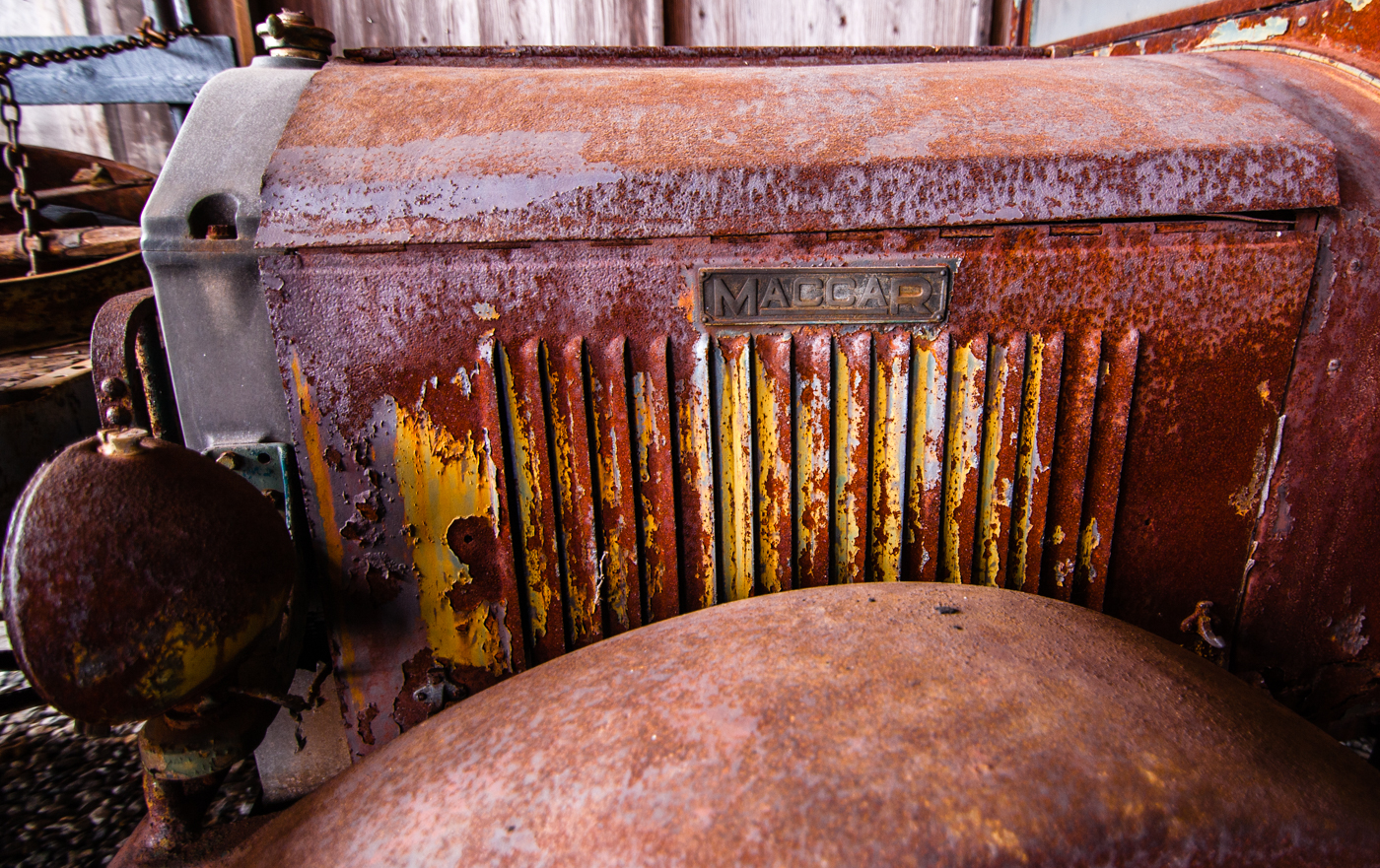
Brand emblem on the hood

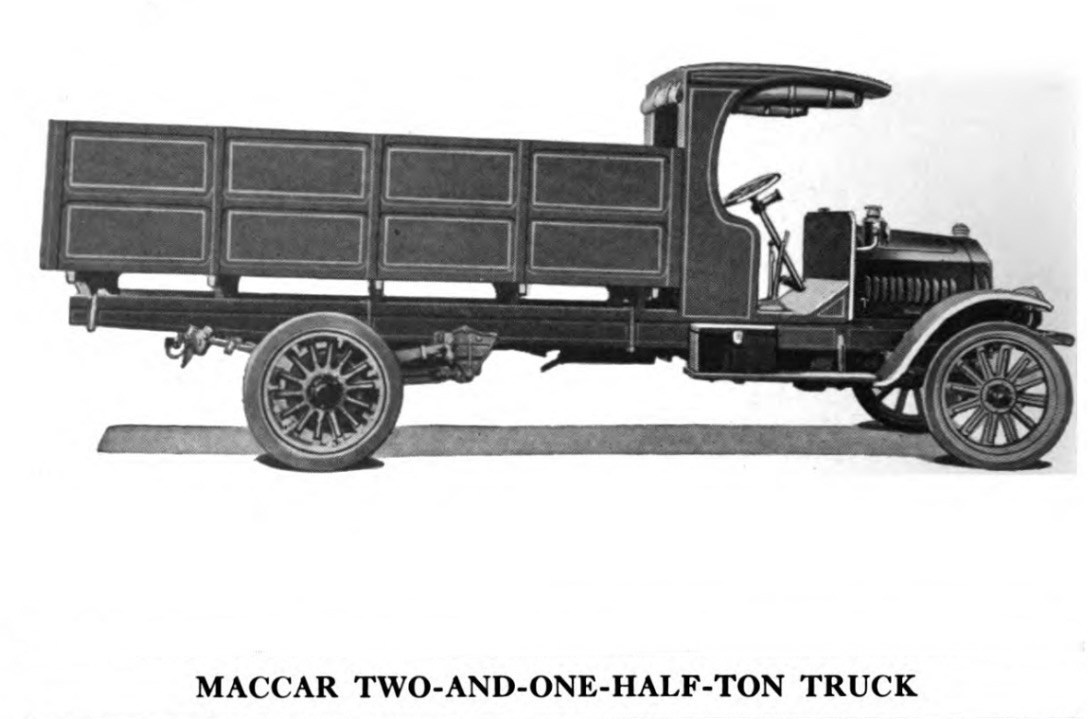
Maccar 2,5 to Truck Model K (1916-1920)

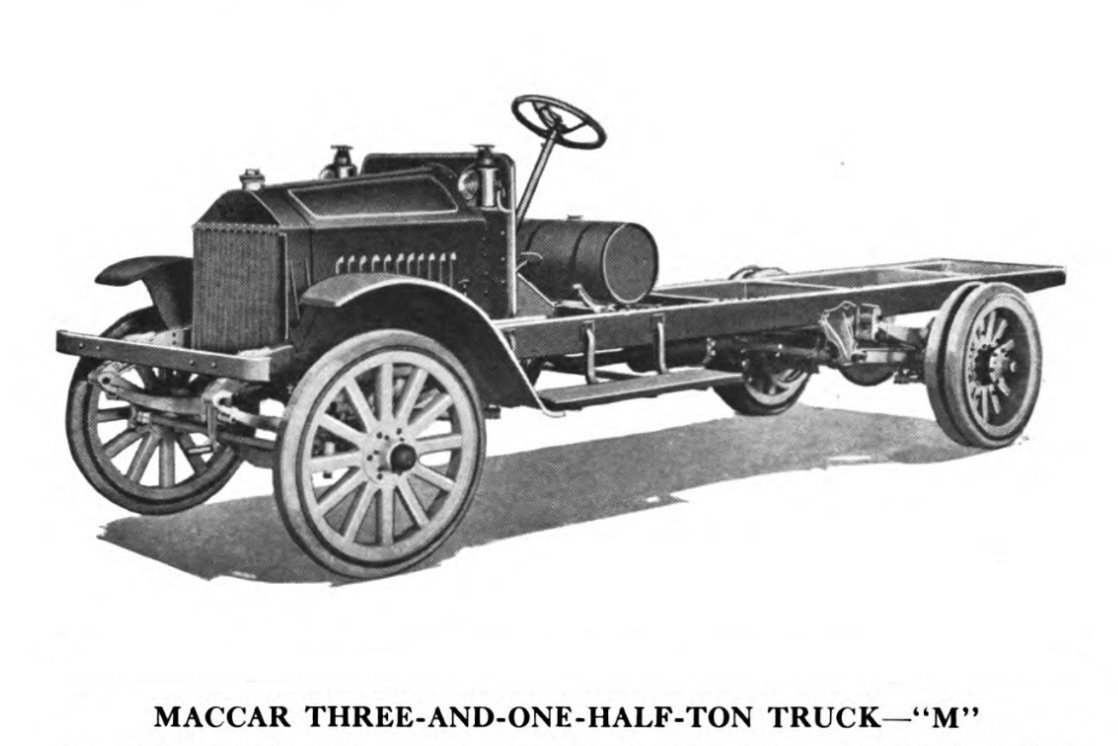
Maccar Model M (1915-1920)

Maccar Model M (1915-1920) 3,5 to

Maccar advertisement (1918)

Maccar advertisement engine swap (1918)

Maccar advertisement (1920)

Maccar advertisement (1926)

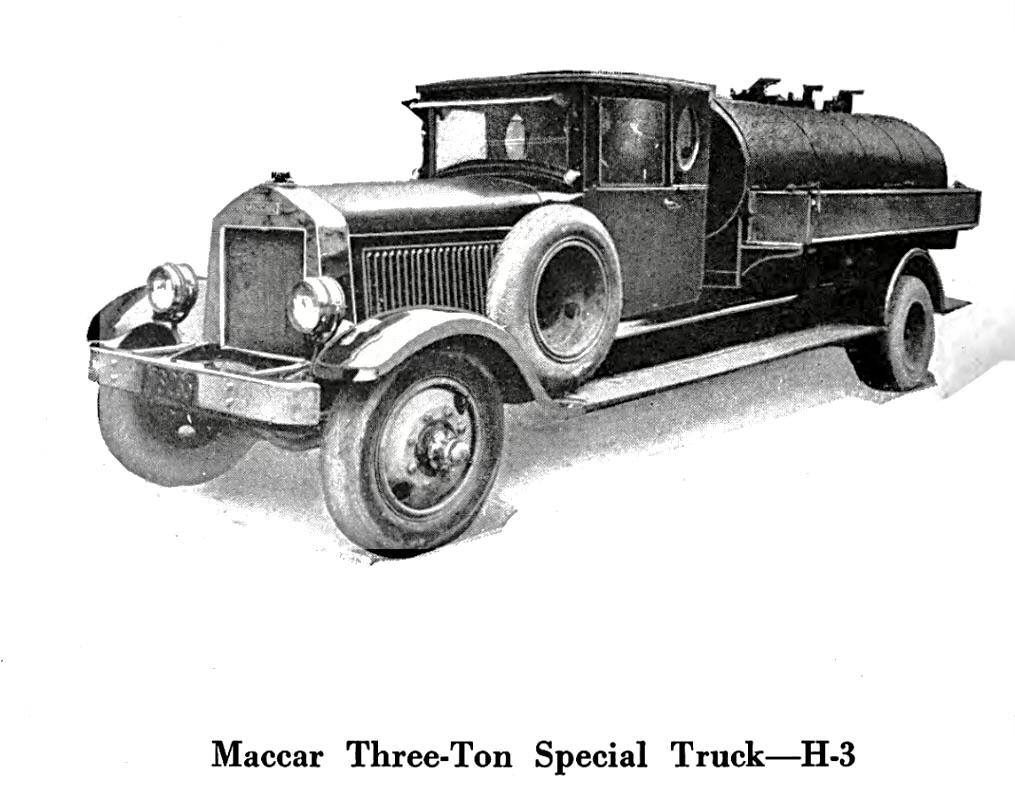
Maccar Model H-3 (1926-1931)

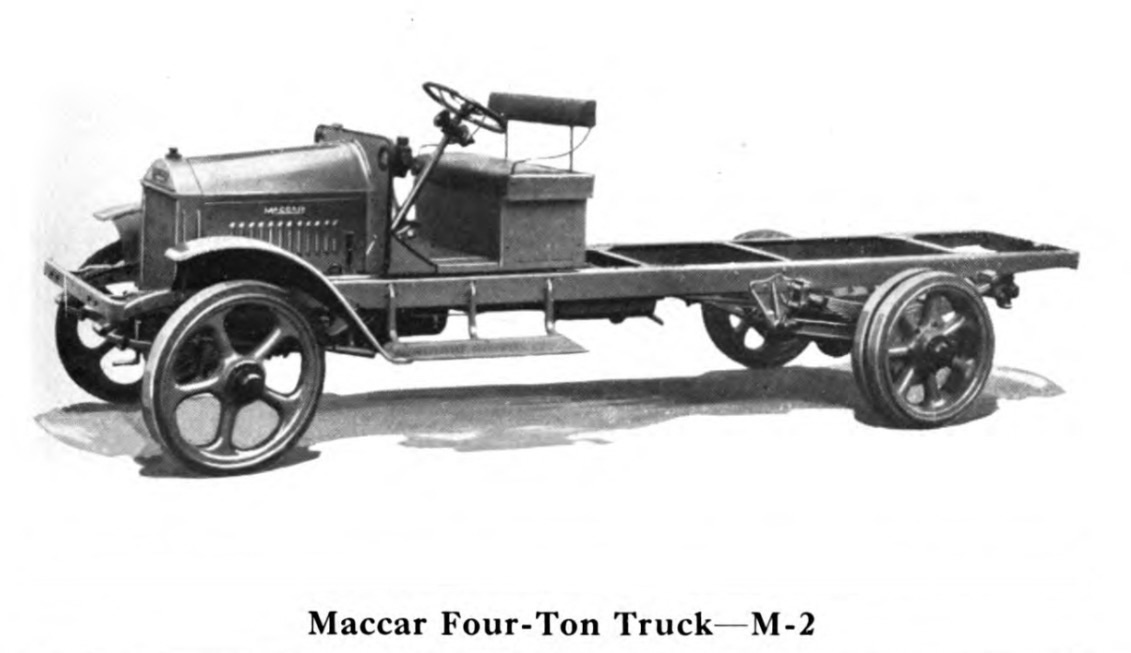
Maccar M-2 (1922-1926)

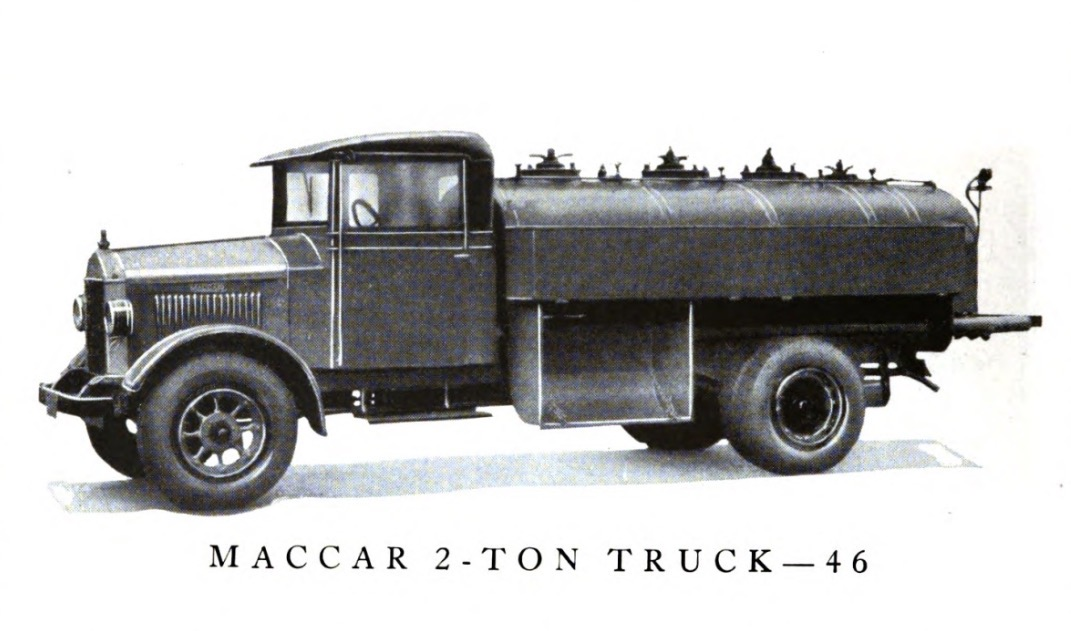
Maccar Model 46 (1928-1931) 2 to

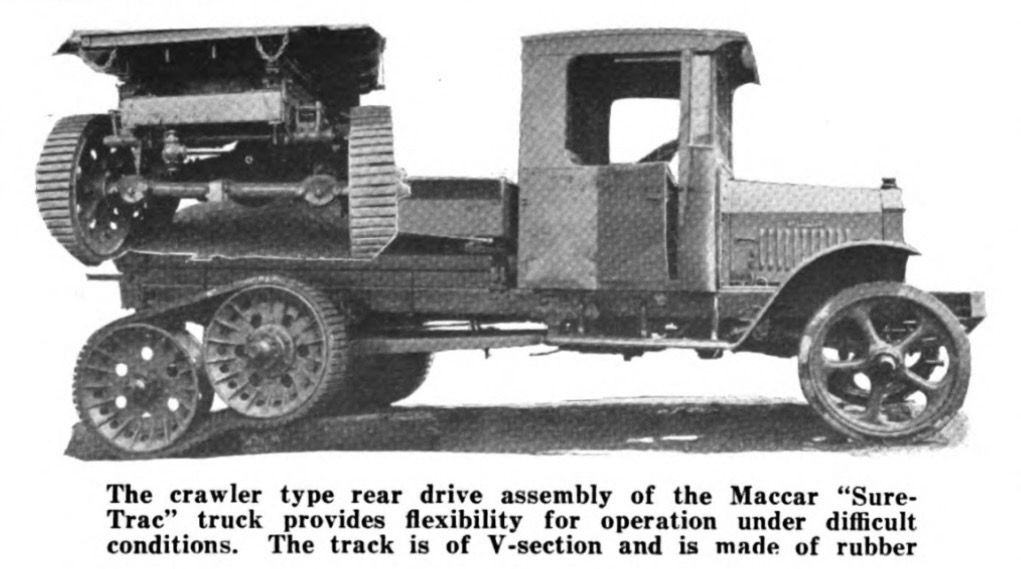
Maccar "Shure Trac" (1928)

The company was founded in 1912. Maccar was named after its two founders, Jack Mack and Roland Carr. Maccar Co. was originally based in Allentown. It was a manufacturer of delivery vans. At the beginning of 1914, the company moved to Scranton due to space reasons and renamed itself to Maccar Truck Company. In addition to delivery vans, trucks were now also being manufactured. At the beginning of 1914, there were 100 workers employed. The production back then was less than one truck per man per year, so it can be assumed that fewer than 100 vehicles were produced in 1914. After analyzing the Branham serial numbers of Maccar trucks of 1914, production will have been around 159 vehicles. This suggests optimized workflows in production to reach this number of vehicles. The previous plant in Allentown was taken over by the Lansden Company from Newark, which was in bankruptcy proceedings. At the end of 1913, machines and unfinished electric trucks from Lansden were stored there. In October 1918, the government ordered 500 vehicles from Maccar for the army. The result can be seen in the high production numbers of the Type M in 1919. Maccar used engines from Continental and Wisconsin. In 1923, R. C. H. Rupp was elected president of the Maccar Truck Co. in Scranton, Pa., succeeding A. B. Warman, who becomes chairman of the board. Mr. Andrew B. Warman, originally the owner of a laundry, was also involved as a bank director of the Peoples National Bank, director of the Chamber of Commerce, director of the Maccar Company, and trustee of the Emanuel Baptist Church, and for ten years he was a director of the Y. M. C. A. In 1929 Maccar joined Selden. Neither of them survived the depression and the business was discontinued in 1935.

== Production models ==
The pre-assigned serial numbers only indicate the maximum possible production quantity.

Year	Production figures	Model	Load capacity	Serial number
1912			0,75 to	
			1,5 to	
1913			to	
1914	26	A	0,75 to	168 to 193
	21	B	1,5 to	535 to 555
	32	C	1,5 to	1030 to 1061
	9	D	2 to	1062 to 1070
	63	E	1 to	556 to 618
	8	F	2 to	2011 to 2018
Sum	159			
1915	5	A	0,75 to	194 to 198
	37	D	2 to	2051 to 2087
	11	E	1 to	2000 to 2010
	19	J	2,5 to	3001 to 3017; 3025 to 3026
	5	F	2 to	2046 to 2050
	28	H	2,5 to	3000 to 3006; 3010 to 3011; 3014 to 3015; 3018 to 3024; 3027 to 3035
	20	M	3,5 to	4000 to 4011; 4016 to 4018; 4021 to 4025
	10	O	3,5 to	4013 to 4015; 4019 to 4020; 4021 to 4025
Sum	135			
1916	5	A	0,75 to	200 to 204
	7	F	2 to	2088 to 2094
	37	D	2 to	2051 to 2087
	156	K	2,5 to	3039 to 3040; 3044 to 3055; 3058 to 3088; 3092 to 3247
	36	L	1,5 to	619 to 654
	11	K	1 to	655 to 665
	17	M	3,5 to	4030 to 4046
	5	O	3,5 to	4025 to 4029
Sum	201			
1917	41	L	1,5 to	666 to 706
	20	H	2,5 to	3251 to 3270
	56	M	3,5 to	4047 to 4053; 4056 to 4057; 4064 to 4065; 4070 to 4114
	12	O	3,5 to	4054 to 4055; 4058 to 4063; 4066 to 4069
	24	U	5,5 to	5000 to 5023
Sum	153			
1918	77	L	1,5 to	707 to 783
	183	H	2,5 to	3271 to 3453
	160	M	3,5 to	4115 to 4274
	38	U	5,5 to	5024 to 5061
Sum	458			
1919	87	L	1,5 to	784 to 870
	203	H	2,5 to	3454 to 3656
	1,070	M	3,5to	3275 to 4344
	38	U	5,5 to	5062 to 5099
	46	G	5,5 to	6000 to 6045
Sum	1,444			
1920	48	S	1 to	10000 to 10047
	↑	S-1	1 to	10000 to 10047
	↑	S-2	1 to	10000 to 10047
	759	L	1,5 to	871 to 1000; A000 to A628
	↑	L-1	1,5 to	871 to 1000; A000 to A628
	191	H	2,5 to	3657 to 3847
	↑	H-1	2,5 to	3657 to 3847
	150	M-1	3,5 to	4344 to 4493
	↑	M	3,5 to	4344 to 4493
	↑	M-2	3,5 to	4344 to 4493
	102	G	5 to	6046 to 6147
	↑	G-1	5 to	6046 to 6147
Sum	1,250			
1921	57	L	1,5 to	A629 to A685
	↑	L-1	1,5 to	A629 to A685
	↑	L-2	1,5 to	A629 to A685
	119	H-2	2,5 to	3848 to 3966
	15	H-A	2 to	30000 to 30014
	↑	H-1	2,5 to	3848 to 3966
	↑	H-2	2,5-3 to	3848 to 3966
	48	M-2	3,5-4 to	4494 to 4541
	30	G	5 to	6148 to 6177
	↑	G-1	5 to	6148 to 6177
	14	S-1	1to	10048 to 10061
	↑	S-2	1 to	10048 to 10061
Sum	283			
1922		L	1,5 to	A 686 to
		H-A	2 to	30015 to
		H-2	3 to	3967 to
		M-2	4 to	4542 to
		G	5 to	6172 to
		SA	1 to	10000 to
		S1	1 to	10061 to
1923		L	1,5 to	
		H-A	2 to	
	221	H-2	3 to	A3179 to A3399
		M-2	4 to	
	31	G	5-6 to	6209 to 6239
1924		EX	1,25 to	
		L 1	1,5 to	
		HAT	2 to	
		H1	3 to	
		M 2	4 to	
		G-1	5 to	
1925		EX	1,25to	
		VI	2 to	
		H-3	3 to	
		M-2	4 to	
		G-1	5 to	
		Bus	40 passenger	51 to
1926		36	1,25 to	361 to
		46	2 to	4631 to
		64	3 to	643 to
		66	3 to	661 to
		94	4 to	941 to
		96	4 to	961 to
		M-2	4to	4755 to
		G-1	5 to	6301 to
		EX	1,25 to	
		SA	1,25 to	
		V1	2 to	
		V3	2 to	
1927		36	1,25 to	
		46	2 to	
		64	3 to	
		66	3 to	
		94	4-5 to	
		96	4-5 to	
		G1	5-6 to	
1928		36	1,25 to	3665 to
		46	2 to	46300 to
		64-100	3 to	64104 to
		66-100	3 to	66110 to
		94	4-5 to	9418 to
		96	4-5 to	9617 to
		G1	5-6 to	6356 to
		84	5to	841 to
		86	5to	861 to
1929		36	1,25 to	36155 to
		36-200	1,5 to	36201 to
		46	2 to	46880 to
		64-100	3 to	64125 to
		66-100	3 to	66160 to
		94	4-5 to	9418 to
		96	4-5 to	9617 to
		G1	5-6 to	6253 to
		84	4-5 to	845 to
		86	4-5 to	864 to
		126 six wheels	6 to	
1930		36200	1,5 to	
		40	2 to	
		56	3 to	
		66100	4 to	
		86	5 to	
		126	6 to	
