= Jaeger (automobile) =

American car from the 1930s

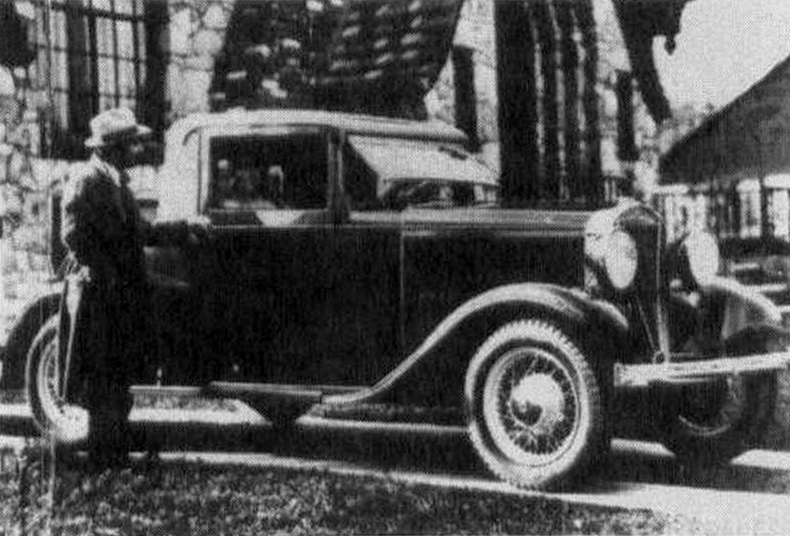
- Charles Jaeger, the creator of the car, seated in the first Jaeger car to be manufactured, in 1931. Photographed in front of the family home he built, 215 W. Woodland Avenue, Ferndale.

Overview
- Manufacturer: Jaeger Motor Corporation of America
- Production: 1931
- Assembly: Belleville, Michigan, United States
- Designer: Charles F. Jaeger

Body and chassis
- Class: Sports car

Powertrain
- Engine: six-cylinder Continental engine

The Jaeger was an automobile built in Belleville, Michigan by the Jaeger Motor Car Company from 1932 to 1933.

== History ==
Charles F. Jaeger patented a novel suspension for automobiles which included two coils in tandem at each wheel separated by the axle mounting. The Jaeger automobile was built to develop this suspension and was powered by a six-cylinder Continental engine, rated at 70 hp (52 kW). Wire wheels were standard on the vehicle, with a V-radiator grille and three diagonal groups of four louvers on each side of the bonnet. Five coupes and convertible coupes were actually produced. The vehicle sold for $700, equivalent to $17,003 in 2024.
