= Kalamazoo Motors Corporation =

Defunct American motor vehicle manufacturer

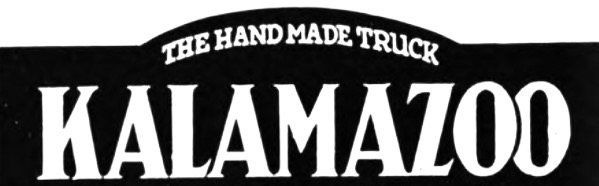
- Formerly: Lane Motor Truck Company
- Type: Truck Company
- Industry: Manufacturing
- Founded: 1919; 107 years ago
- Founder: Charles B. Hays, Arthur L. Pratt, Frank H. Milham, Noah Bryant, Joseph E. Brown, Hale P. Kauffer, Hugh Alexander Crawford
- Defunct: 1923; 103 years ago
- Headquarters: Kalamazoo, Michigan, US
- Products: Trucks

The Kalamazoo Motors Corporation of Kalamazoo, Michigan, was a truck manufacturer.

== History ==
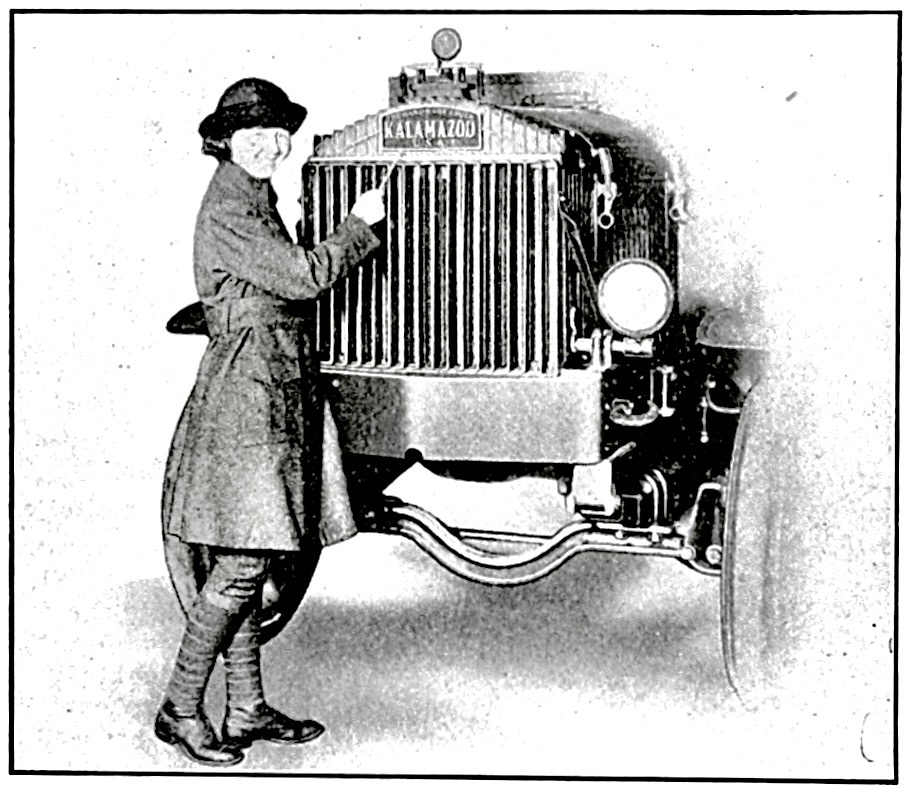
Kalamazoo truck radiator (1920)

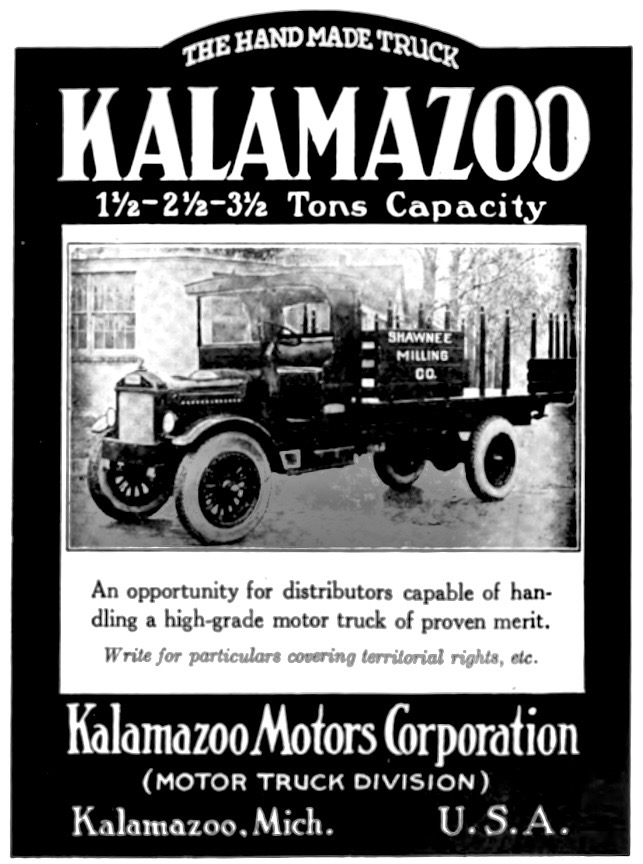
Kalamazoo advertisement (1921)

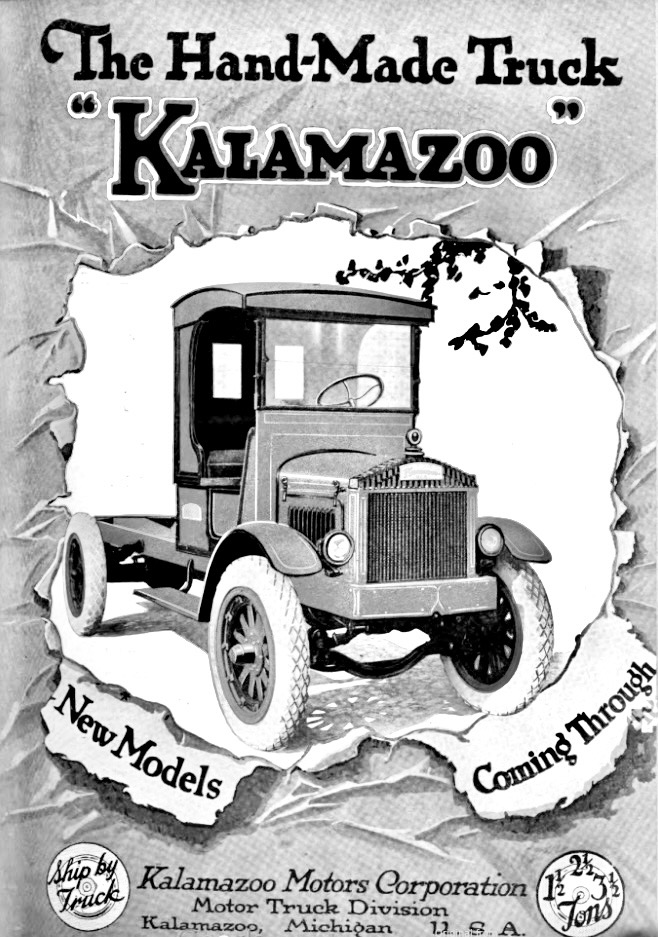
The Hand Made Truck Kalamazoo (1920)

In March 1919, the Lane Motor Truck Company was taken over by the newly founded Kalamazoo Motors Corporation (KMC). The starting capital was $250,000. The new truck line was marketed under the brand name 'Kalamazoo'. "Kalamazoo" is a Native American name: "Kala" comes from "calliope," which refers to an organ that makes a mighty noise; "mazoo" comes from the original word "mazuma," meaning money. The investors of the new company were Charles B. Hays, Arthur L. Pratt (president of the King Paper Company ), Frank H. Milham, Noah Bryant, Joseph E. Brown, and Hale P. Kauffer (all associated with the Bryant Paper Company), as well as Hugh Alexander Crawford (former mayor of Flint and president of the Lull Carriage Company). Hugh Crawford became the new company president. Lembert W. Coppock (from Lane Motor Truck Co.) continued his work as chief engineer and production manager. The new company used the facilities of Lane Motor Truck Co. on Fulford Street. In the first year, the focus was on trucks in the 1½ ton, 2½ ton, and 3½ ton categories. The company's goal was to produce 1,000 trucks in the first year. The former Lane factory building was expanded with a 140-square-meter addition for the paint shop. The workshop was enlarged by 185 square meters. Local industry bought trucks from Kalamazoo. The Kalamazoo Hack & Bus Company, the Michigan Coca-Cola Bottling Company, Kalamazoo Storage, the Kalamazoo Fire Department, Corlett-Stone Lumber, and Wolverine Construction were among the first in the city to own 'Kalamazoo' trucks. In June 1919, James F. Johnson bought a 1½-ton 'Kalamazoo' bus for use on his Long Lake and West Lake bus routes. In July, a 2½-ton 'Kalamazoo' truck was shipped to Arnhem in the Netherlands, reaching the first foreign customers. Production was around 125 to 150 trucks per month in 1919. In 1919, about a hundred workers were employed at the Kalamazoo Motors Corporation. In February 1920, the company's capital was increased to 1 million dollars. For the 1920 models, four-cylinder engines were used instead of the six-cylinder versions used the previous year. The smallest truck, the 'Model G' with 1½ tons, used a four-cylinder engine from Continental Motors. The trucks 'Model H' with 2½ tons and 'Model K' with 3½ tons got four-cylinder engines from Wisconsin. The 'H' and 'K' models had metal wheels with pneumatic tires, which was still a relatively new development at the time, while the 'G' model kept the traditional wooden wheels. The 1922 model lineup offered ten trucks: a one-ton Speed Truck, four commercial vehicle models with capacities from 1½ to 5 tons, four tractor units from 6 to 15 tons, and a coach for 18 people. The lighter trucks had pneumatic tires, while the heavy-duty models had solid rubber tires. In May 1923, the company was declared bankrupt and put under receivership. In August 1923, the Kalamazoo Motors Corporation was dissolved. The factory complex on Fulford Street was sold in 1926 to the Voigtmann Metal Window Corporation from Chicago.

== Production models ==
The pre-assigned serial numbers only indicate the maximum possible production quantity.

Year	Production figures	Model	Load capacity	Serial number
1919		G1	1,5 to	
		H	2,5 to	
		K	3,5 to	
1920		G1	1,5 to	
		G2	2 to	
		H	2,5 to	
		K	3,5 to	
1921		G1	1,5 to	10000 to
		G2	2 to	10000 to
		H4	2,5 to	20000 to
		H3	2,5 to	20000 to
		K	3,5 to	75000 to
		K5	5 to	75000 to
1922		G1	1,5 to	
		LG	2 to	
		NH	3 to	
		HD	3 to	20000 to 50000
		SK	4 to	50000 to 60000
		OK	5 to	75001 to 80000
			to	
1923		T	1 to	
		G1	1,5 to	1001 to 9999
		LG	2 to	10000 to 19999
		NH	3 to	20000 to 50000
		HD	3 to	20000 to 50000
		SK	4 to	50000 to 60000
		OK	5 to	75001 to 80000
			to	
