= Atterbury Motor Truck Company =

Defunct American motor vehicle manufacturer

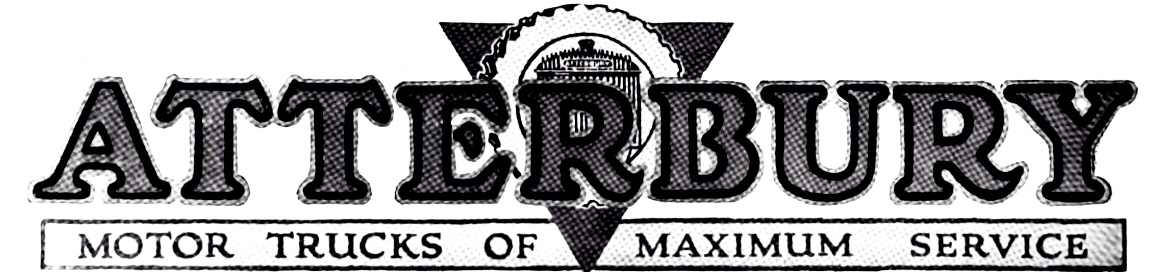
- Type: Truck and Car Company
- Industry: Manufacturing
- Founded: 1904; 122 years ago
- Founder: George W. Atterbury; Elmer B. Olmstead; John B. Corcoran
- Defunct: 1935; 91 years ago
- Headquarters: Buffalo, New York, US
- Products: Trucks cars

The Atterbury Motor Truck Company of Buffalo, New York, was a truck and car manufacturer.

== History ==
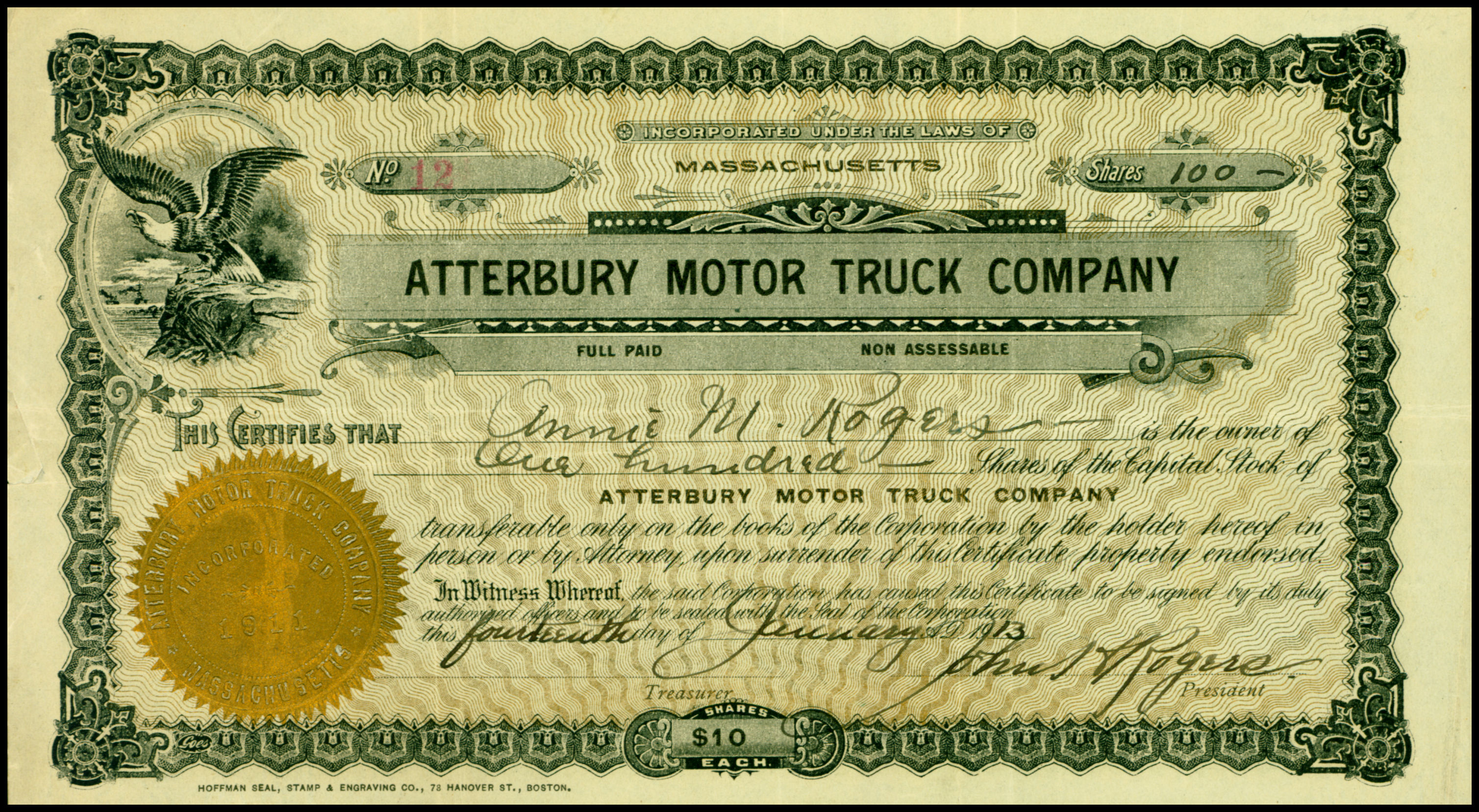
Atterbury Motor Truck 1913

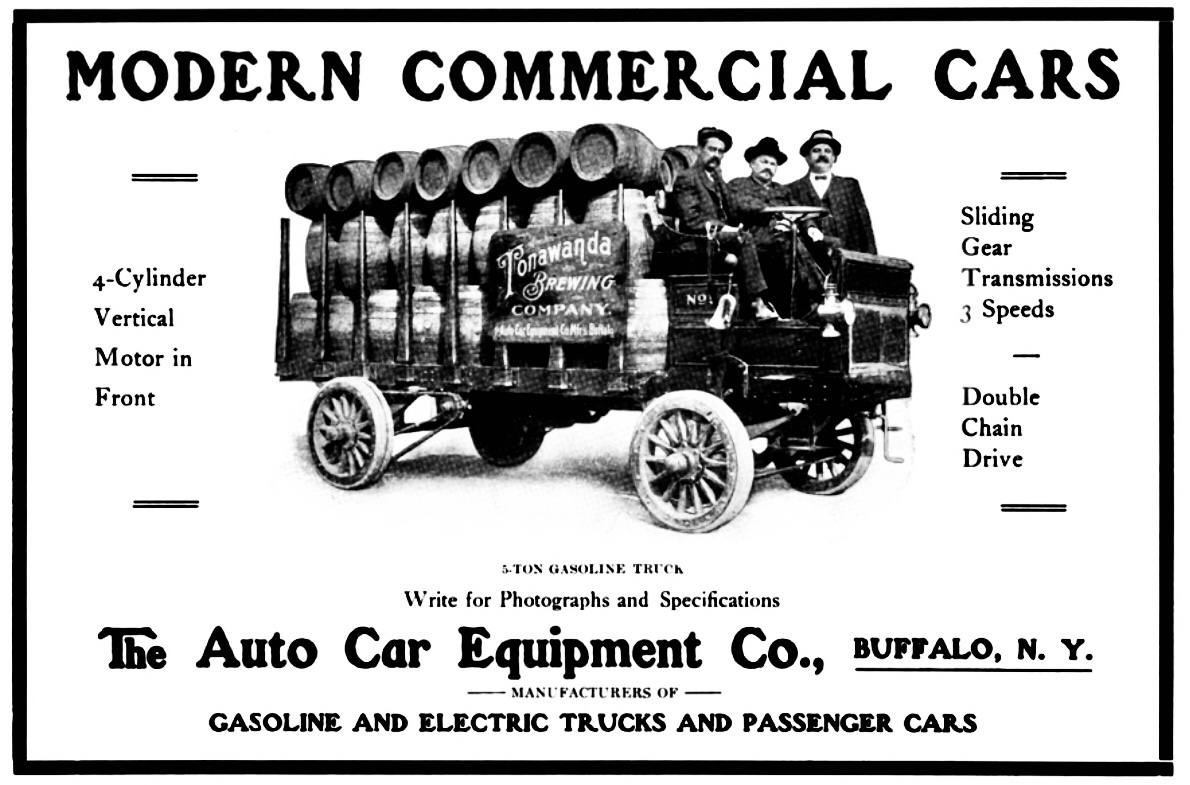
Auto Car Equipment Company (1906)

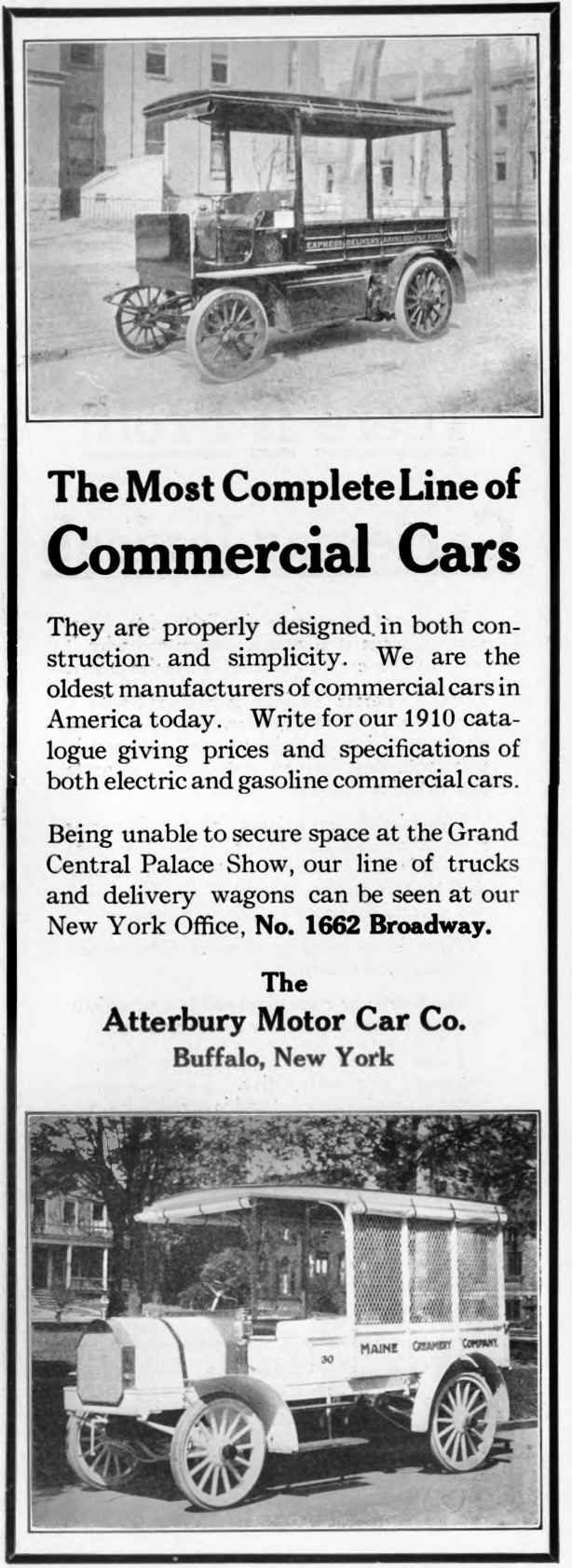
Atterbury advertisement (1910)

Buffalo Model A, Model L (1910)

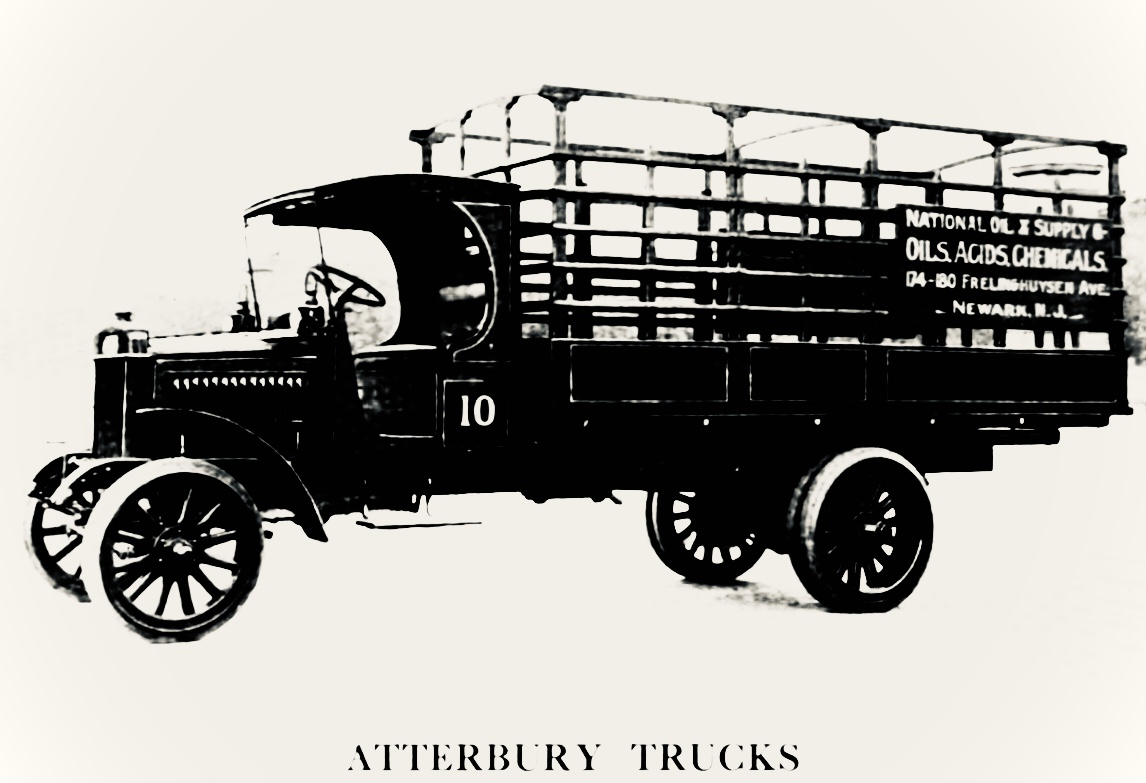
Atterbury 7C (1919) 2 to

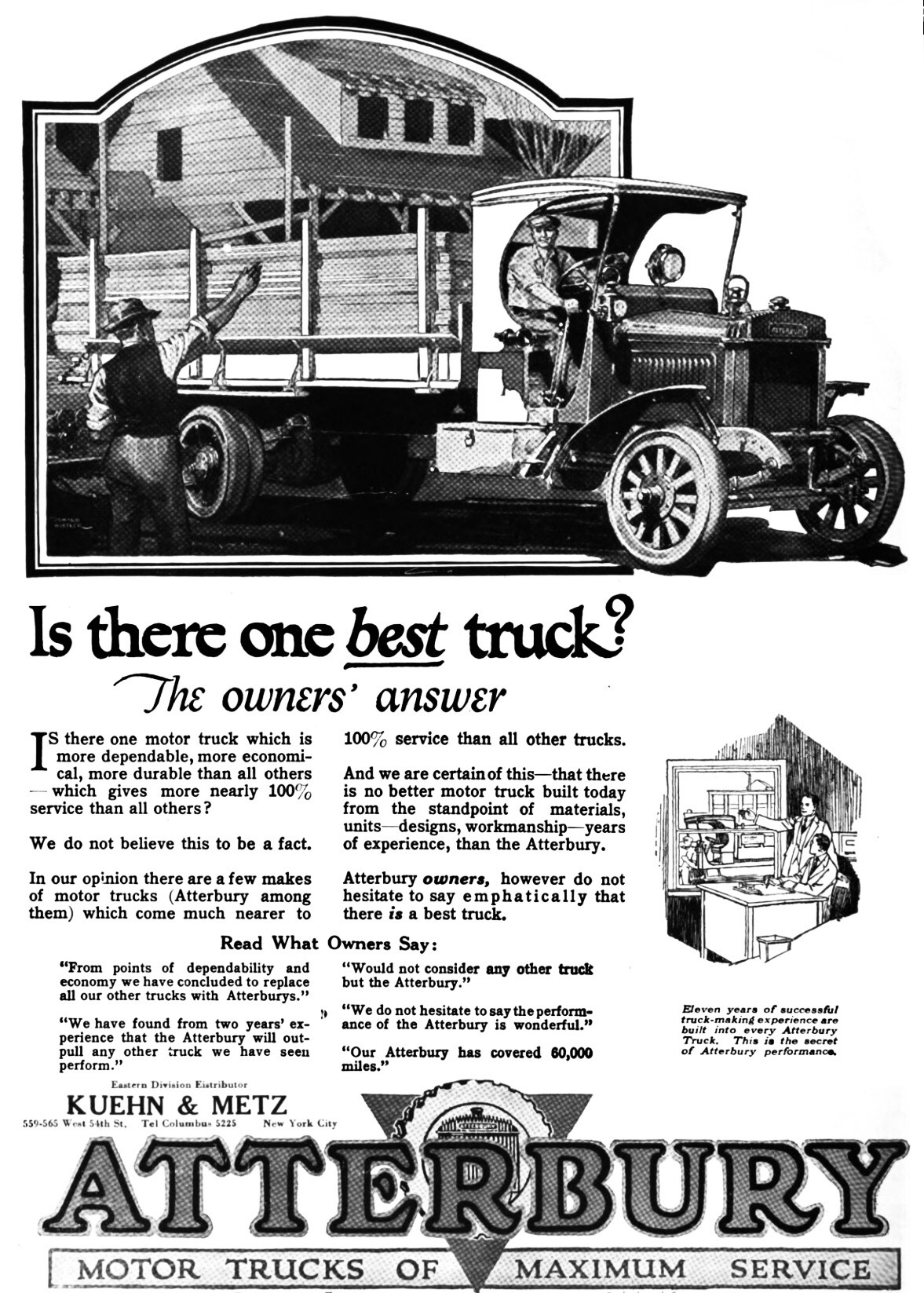
Atterbury advertisement (1920)

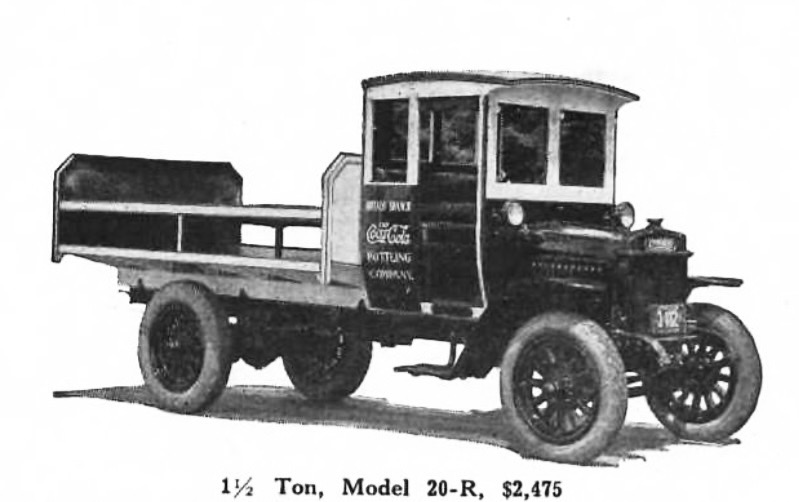
Atterbury Model 20-R (1922) 1,5 to

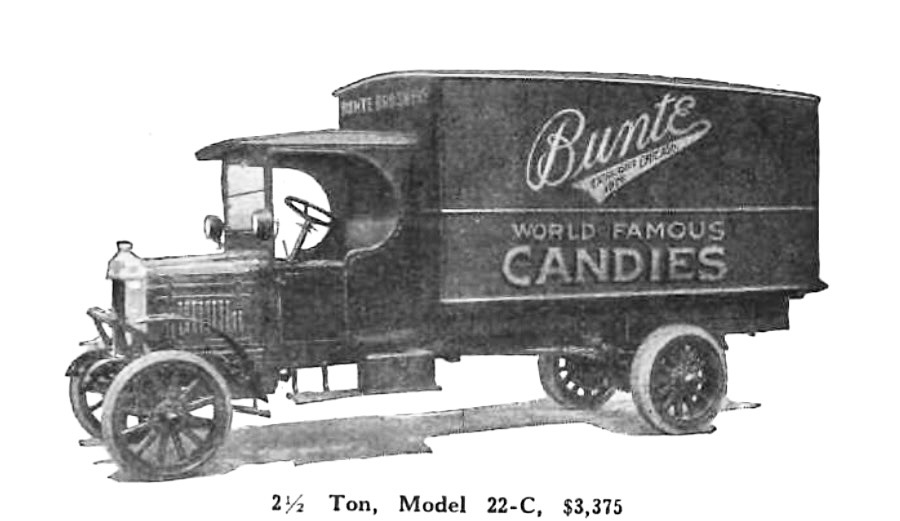
Atterbury Model 22-C (1922) 2,5 to

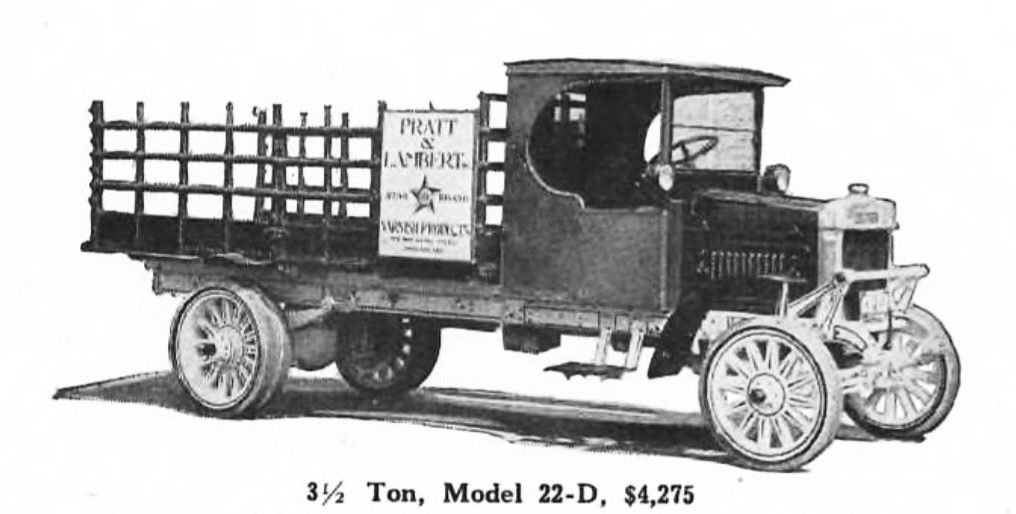
Atterbury Model 22-D (1922) 3,5 to

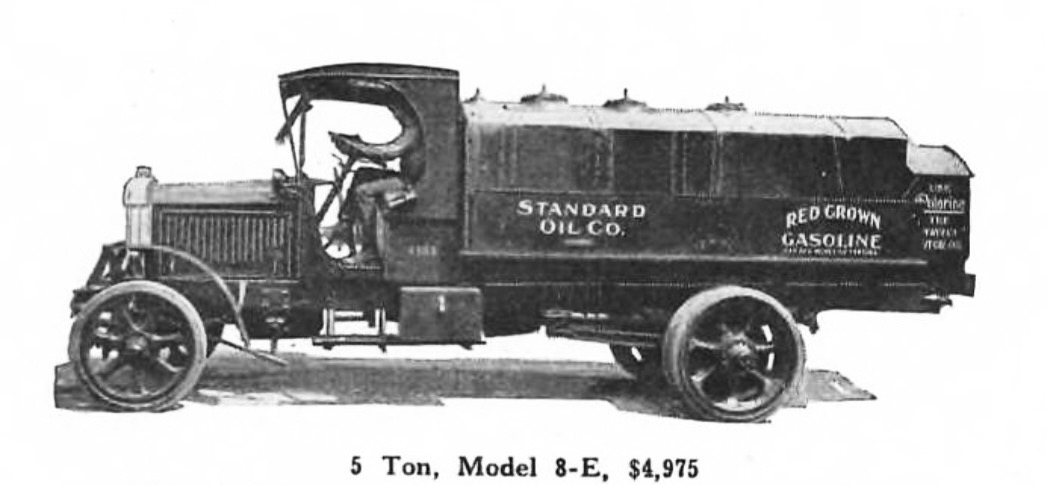
Atterbury Model 8-E (1922) 5 to

Atterbury advertisement (1925)

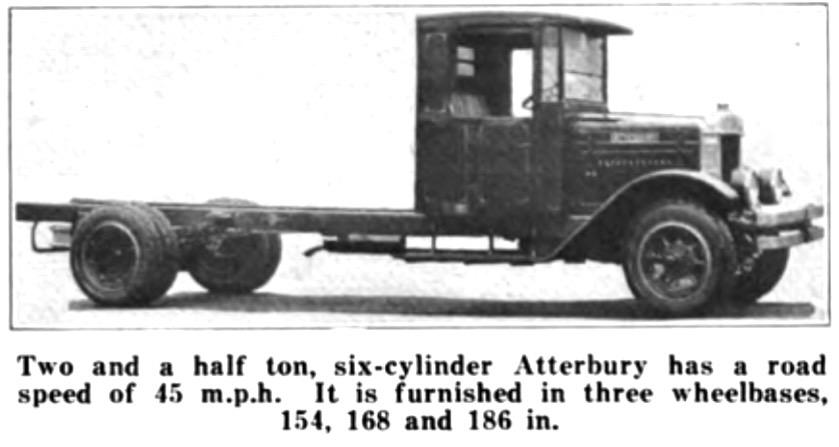
Atterbury Model 27-R-6 (1928)

The company, originally founded under These name Auto Car Equipment Company by George W. Atterbury, Elmer B. Olmstead, and John B. Corcoran, initially produced only commercial vehicles. From 1907 onwards, passenger cars were also manufactured. In December 1909, the company was renamed in Atterbury Motor Car Company to avoid confusion with the similar Autocar. Between 1908 and 1910, commercial vehicles were offered under the brand name Buffalo. In March 1912, the company was renamed again to Atterbury Motor Truck Company. In addition to domestic sales, Atterbury trucks were also sold in Sweden. Truck production finally ended in 1935 due to the Great Depression.

== Production Models ==
- Buffalo Model A
- Buffalo Model K
- Buffalo Model L
- Buffalo Model O
- Buffalo Model N
- Buffalo Model M
- Buffalo Model S
- Buffalo Model H

In 1914, a 0.75 t, a 1.5 t, a 2.5 t, and a 3.5 t were sold.

- Atterbury Model D-W 3t (1915)

1917

- 6B (1 to)
- 6R (1,5 to)
- 7C (2 to)
- 7D (3,5 to)
- 7E (5 to)

In 1920, a 1.5 t, a 2.5 t, a 3.5 t, and a 5 t were sold.

1922

- Atterbury Model 20-R
  - The top speed was 20 miles per hour = 32 km/h.
  - The wheelbase was 144 inches = 3658 mm.
  - The engine had a displacement of 3620 cc with a bore of 95.25 mm and a stroke of 127 mm. The motor came from Continental.
- Atterbury Model 22-C
  - The top speed was 19.5 miles per hour = 31 km/h.
  - The wheelbase was 156 inches = 3962 mm.
  - The wheelbase was 180 inches = 4572 mm. long version
  - The engine had a displacement of 4599 cc with a bore of 104.775 mm and a stroke of 133.35 mm. The motor came from Continental.
- Atterbury Model 22-D
  - The top speed was 16.5 miles per hour = 26 km/h.
  - The wheelbase was 150 inches = 3810 mm. short version
  - The wheelbase was 174 inches = 4420 mm.
  - The wheelbase was 198 inches = 5029 mm. long version
  - The engine had a displacement of 5734 cc with a bore of 114.3 mm and a stroke of 139.7 mm. The motor came from Continental.
- Atterbury Model 8-E
  - The wheelbase was 168 inches = 4267 mm.
  - The wheelbase was 192 inches = 4877 mm. long version
  - The engine had a displacement of 6969 cc with a bore of 120.65 mm and a stroke of 152.4 mm. The motor came from Continental.
