= Moose Jaw Standard =

Defunct Canadian Motor Vehicle Manufacturer

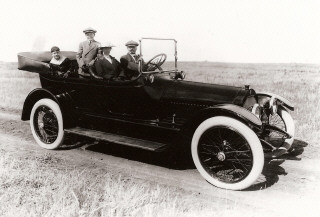
The Moose Jaw Standard

The Moose Jaw Standard was a Canadian automobile manufactured in Moose Jaw, Saskatchewan in 1917.

Five local residents imported the parts to build twenty-five luxury cars from the United States; these were to be powered by Continental engines. Once each investor had a car, they gave up the concern after realizing that no one else was willing to buy. The remaining parts were sold, the engineer was paid off, and the project was wound up.
