= Severin Motor Car Company =

Defunct American motor vehicle manufacturer

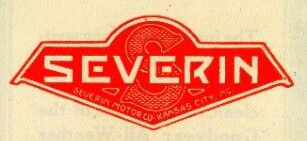
- Company type: Automobile Manufacturing
- Industry: Automotive
- Founded: 1920; 106 years ago
- Founder: Homer T. Severin
- Defunct: 1921; 105 years ago
- Fate: Bankrupt
- Headquarters: Kansas City, Missouri, United States
- Products: Automobiles

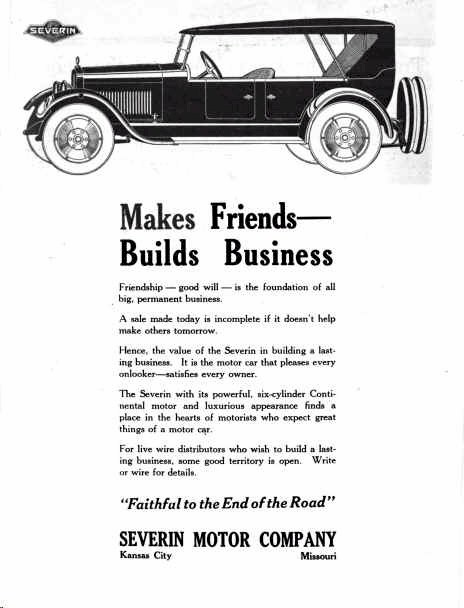
Severin Motor Car Company advertisement

The Severin Motor Car Company was a short-lived automobile manufacturer that started making cars in 1920 in Kansas City, Missouri and ended in accusations of stock fraud in 1921.

== History ==
Homer T. Severin formed Severin Motor Car Company in his native Kansas City and production began in July 1920. The Severin Model H was offered as a 5-passenger touring car for $2,400 (equivalent to $38,571 in 2025). Power came from a Continental Motors Company six-cylinder engine.

Homer Severin went to California and announce intentions to move the company to a site in Oakland, California. He began selling stock but did not get permits to do so. He decided to leave the automobile business and went into real estate instead. Mohawk Motor Company took over the Severin assets but was bankrupt within a month. Metropolitan Motors Corporation took over the assets to build the remaining 300 Severins from parts on hand. The last Severins were assembled in 1922
