= Columbia Motor Truck & Trailer Company =

Defunct American motor vehicle manufacturer

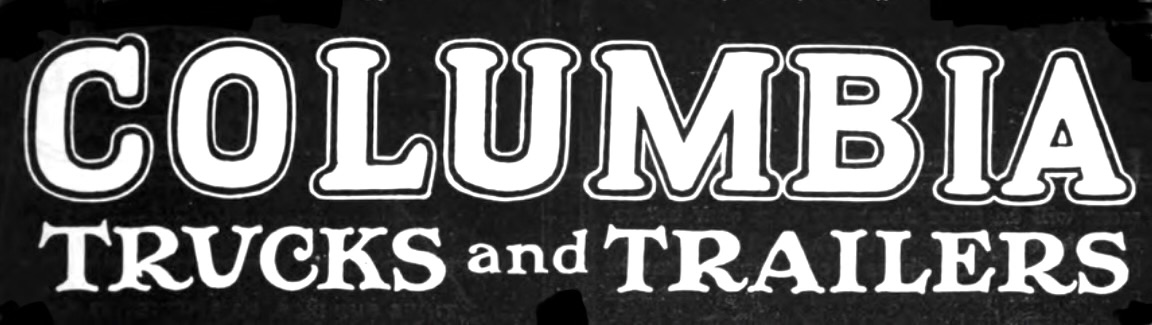
- Type: Truck Company
- Industry: Manufacturing
- Founded: 1915; 111 years ago
- Defunct: 1926; 100 years ago
- Headquarters: Pontiac, Michigan, US
- Products: Trucks , Trailer

The Columbia Motor Truck & Trailer Company of Pontiac, Michigan, was an American truck manufacturer.

== History ==
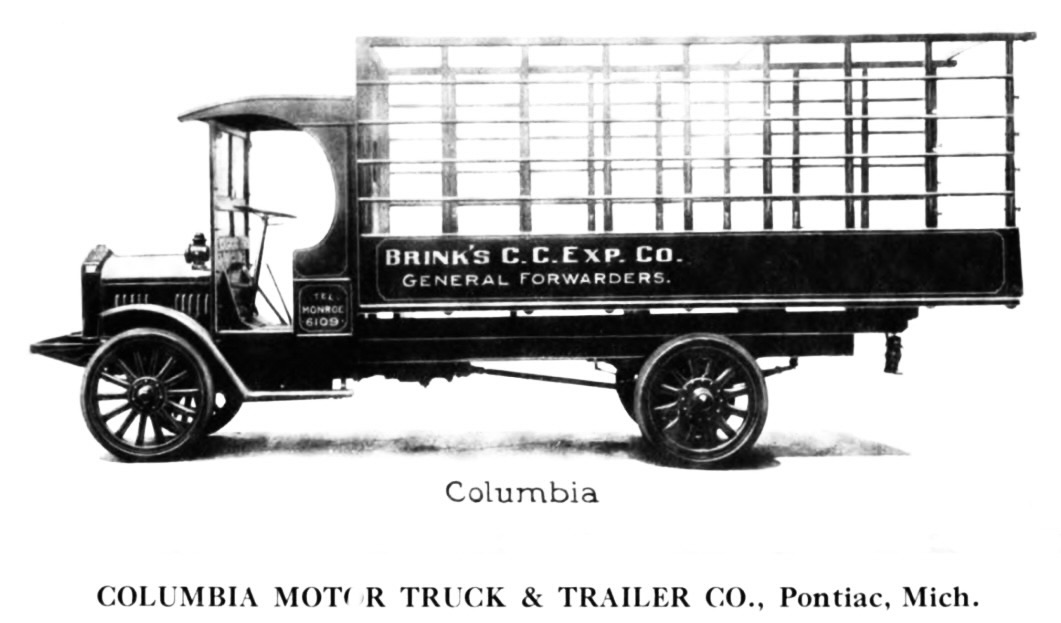
Columbia Model G

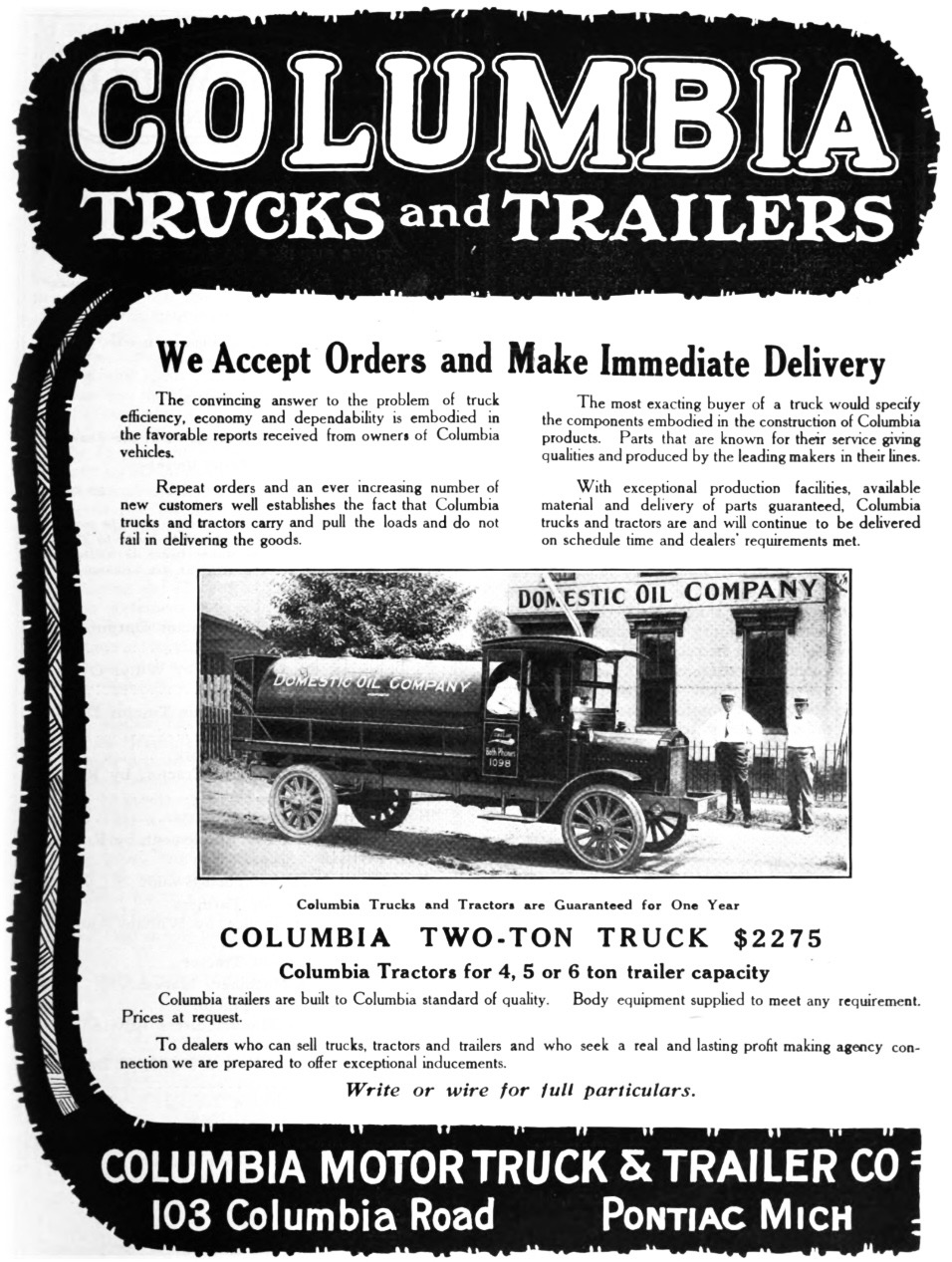
Columbia Model E advertisement (1918)

Columbia plant (1919)

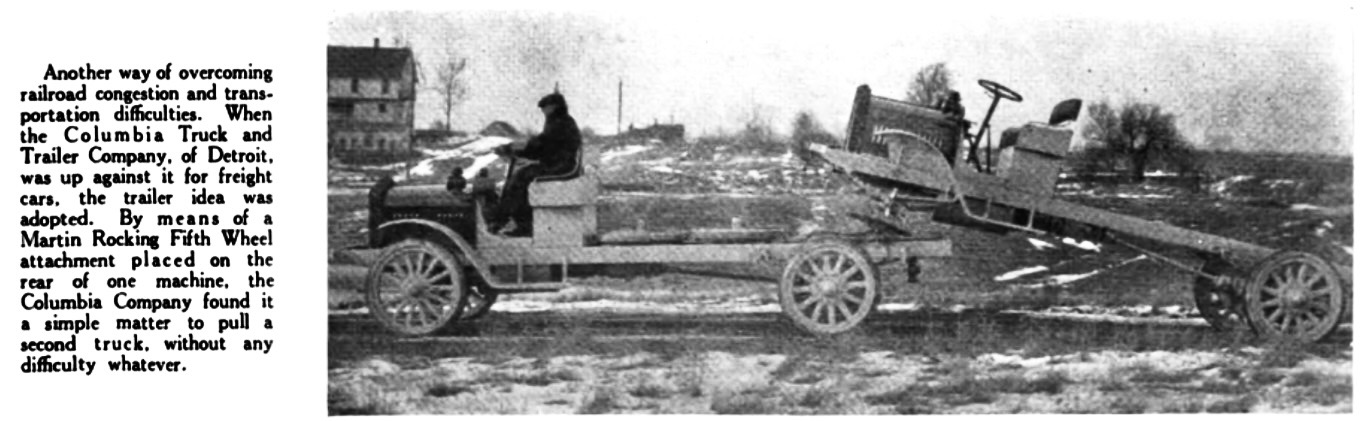
Simple and cheap way to get to the customer

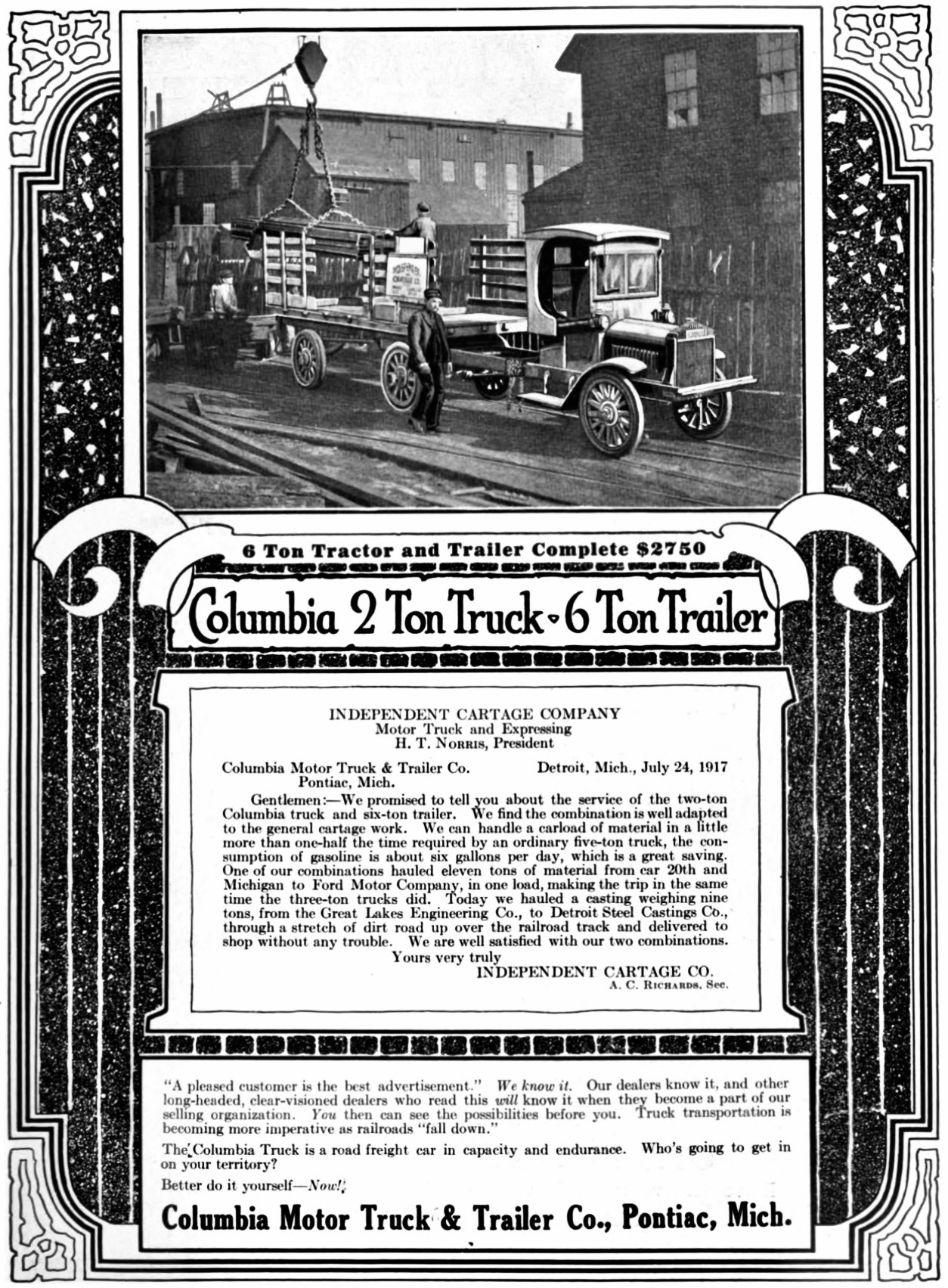
Columbia advertisement 6 to trailer (1918)

The company was founded in 1915, with its headquarters at 103 Columbia Road in Pontiac, Michigan. For the engines, they went with models from Continental or Hinkley. The production was discontinued in 1926.

There is no connection to Columbia from 1899-1910.

== Production models ==
The pre-assigned serial numbers only indicate the maximum possible production quantity.

Year	Production figures	Model	Load capacity	Serial number
1915	34	C	2 to	43 to 76
1916	69	E	2 to	77 to 145
1917	488	E	2 to	146 to 633
1918	145	E	2 to	634 to 778
		FT	3 to	↑
1919	125	E	2 to	779 to 903
		ET	6 to	↑
		H	1,5 to	↑
1920	31	F	1 to	904 to 934
	51	G	2,5 to	5001 to 5051
		GT	6 to	↑
1921		H	1,5 to	5058 to
		G	2,5 to	↑
1922		H	1,5 to	5058 to
		G	2,5 to	↑
1923		F	1 to	5062 to
		G	2,5 to	5071 to
		H	2,5 to	5062 to
1924		G	2,5 to	5062 to
		K	3 to	5062 to
		L	2 to	5062 to
1925		G	2,5 to	5102 to
		K	3 to	5102 to
		L	2 to	5102 to
1926		G	2,5 to	
		K	3 to	
		L	2 to	
		H	1,5 to	

Year	Trailer Model	Load capacity
1919	6S	5,5 to
	3T	2,7 to
	5T	4,5 to
