= Bessemer Motor Truck Company =

Defunct American motor vehicle manufacturer

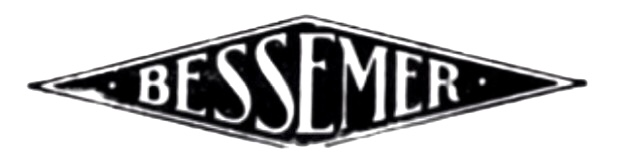
- Type: Truck and Car Company
- Industry: Manufacturing
- Founded: 1911; 115 years ago
- Defunct: 1923; 103 years ago
- Headquarters: Grove City, Pennsylvania, US
- Products: Trucks ; Automobiles

Bessemer Motor Truck Company of Grove City, Pennsylvania, was a car and truck manufacturer.

== History ==
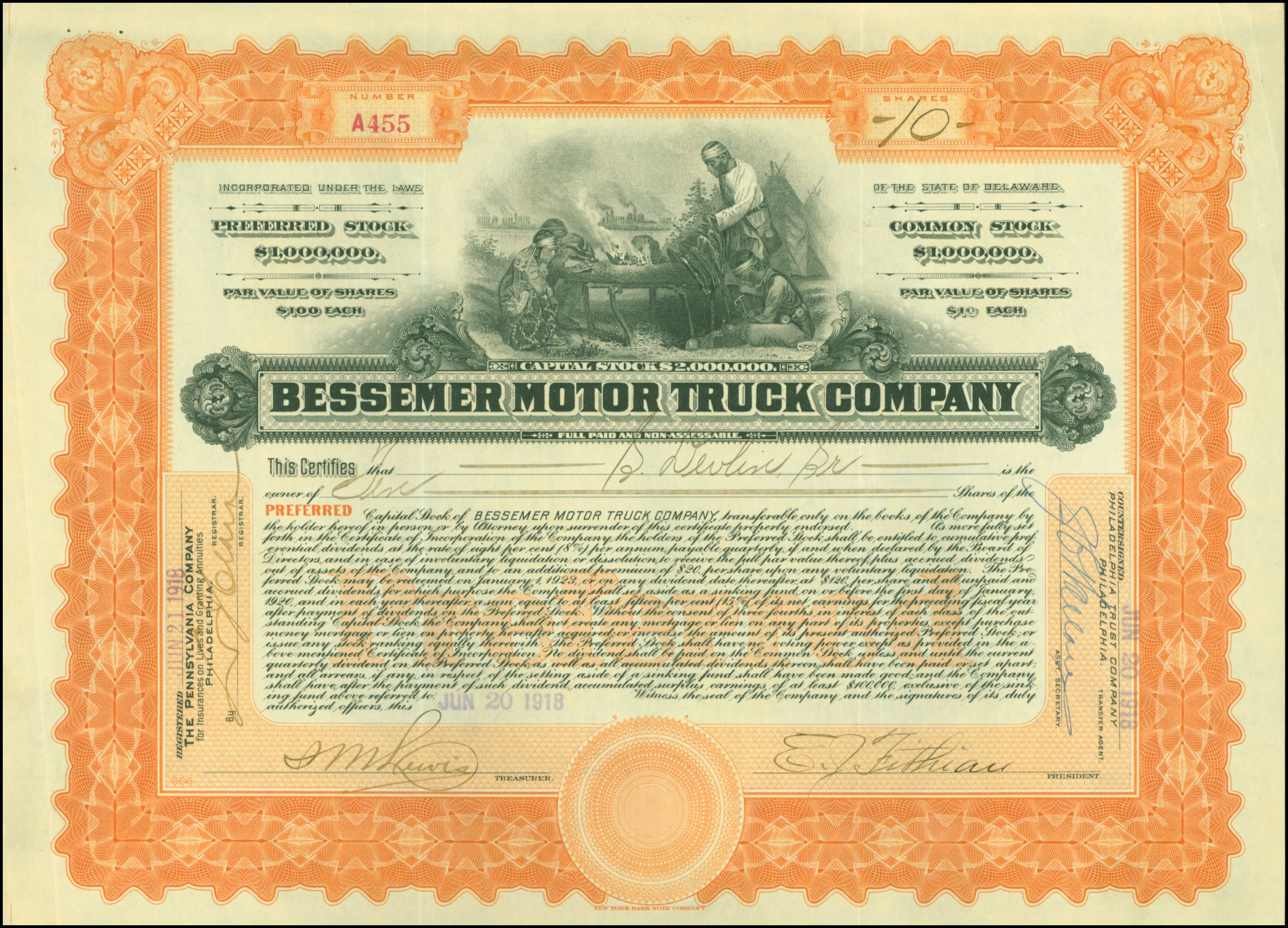
Bessemer Motor Truck Comp. 1918

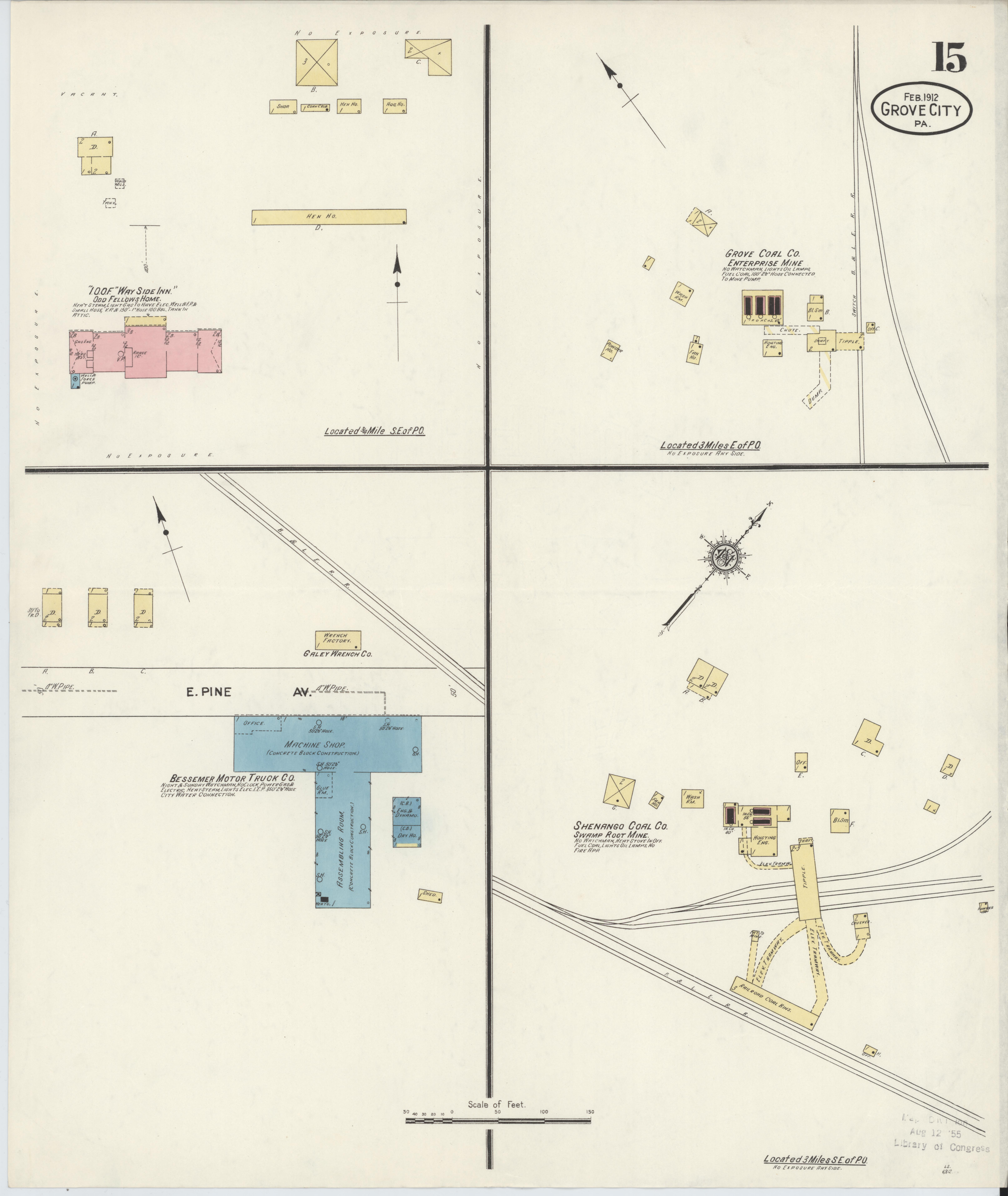
Bessemer plant 1912

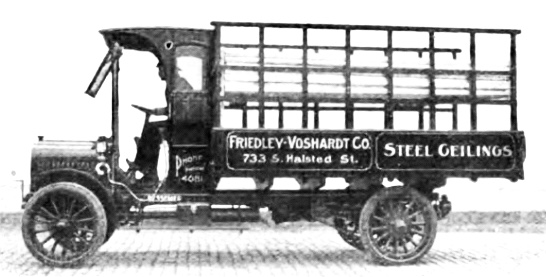
Bessemer Model A (1914)

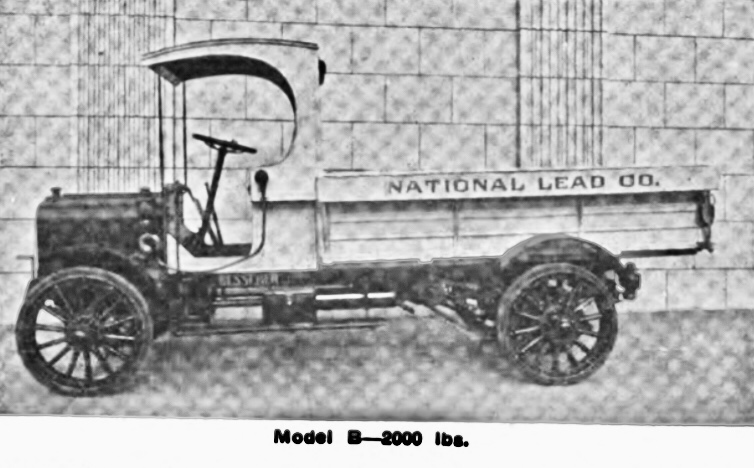
Bessemer Model B (1913)

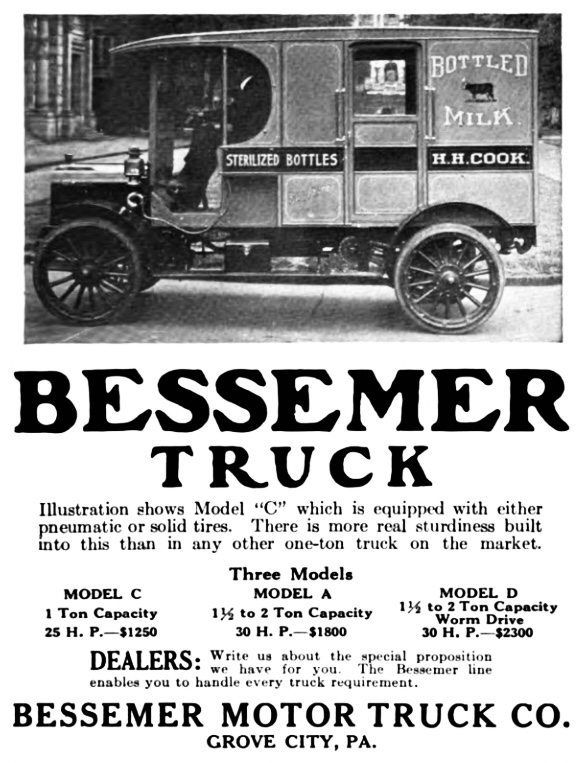
Bessemer Model C (1915)

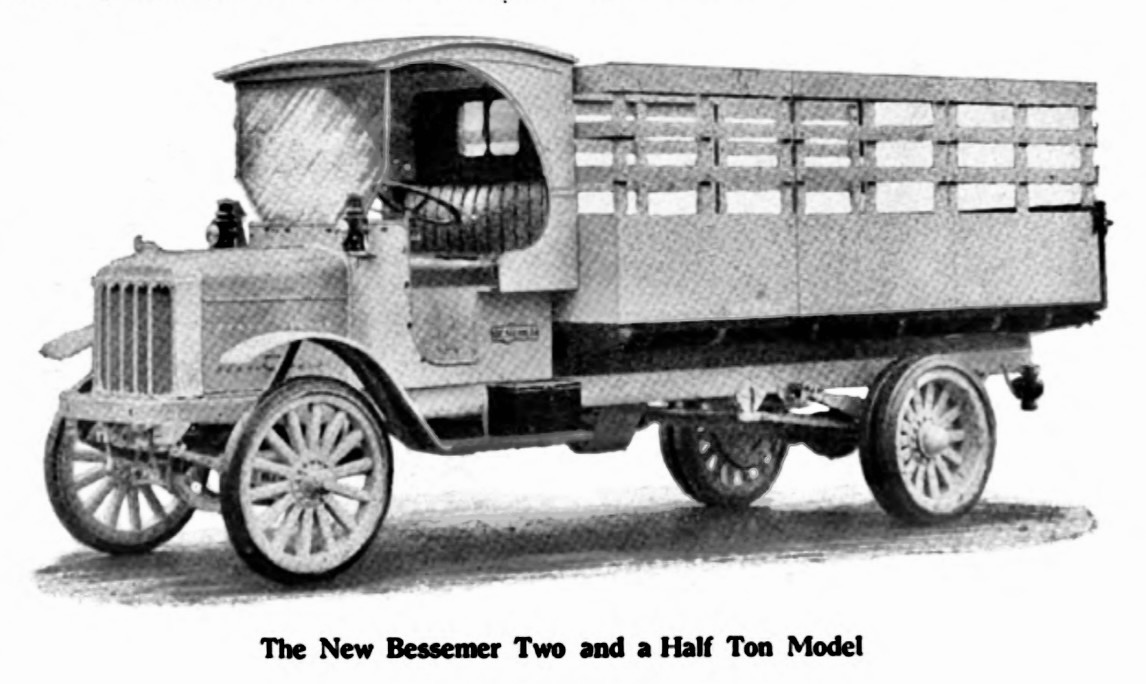
Bessemer Model J-2 (1919-1922) 2,5 to

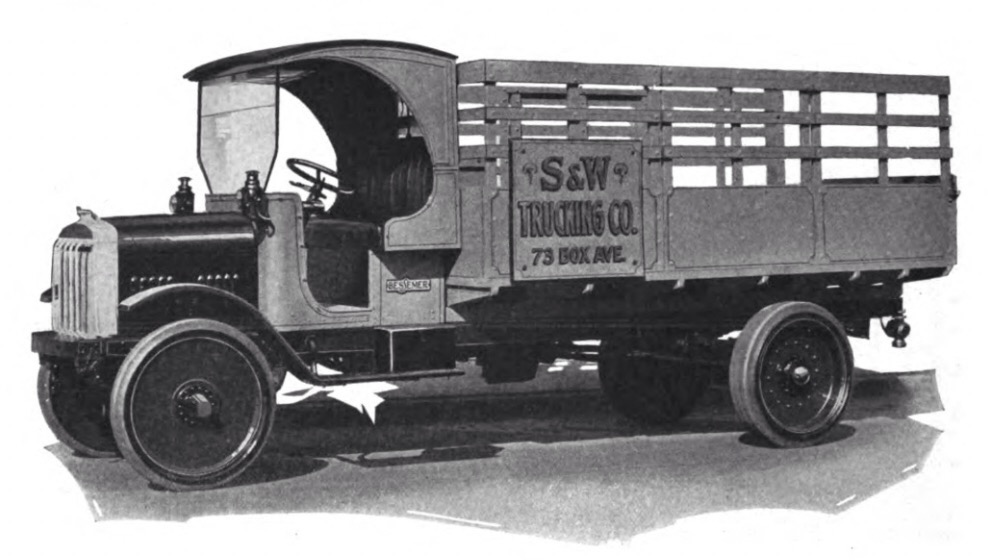
Bessemer Truck (1920)

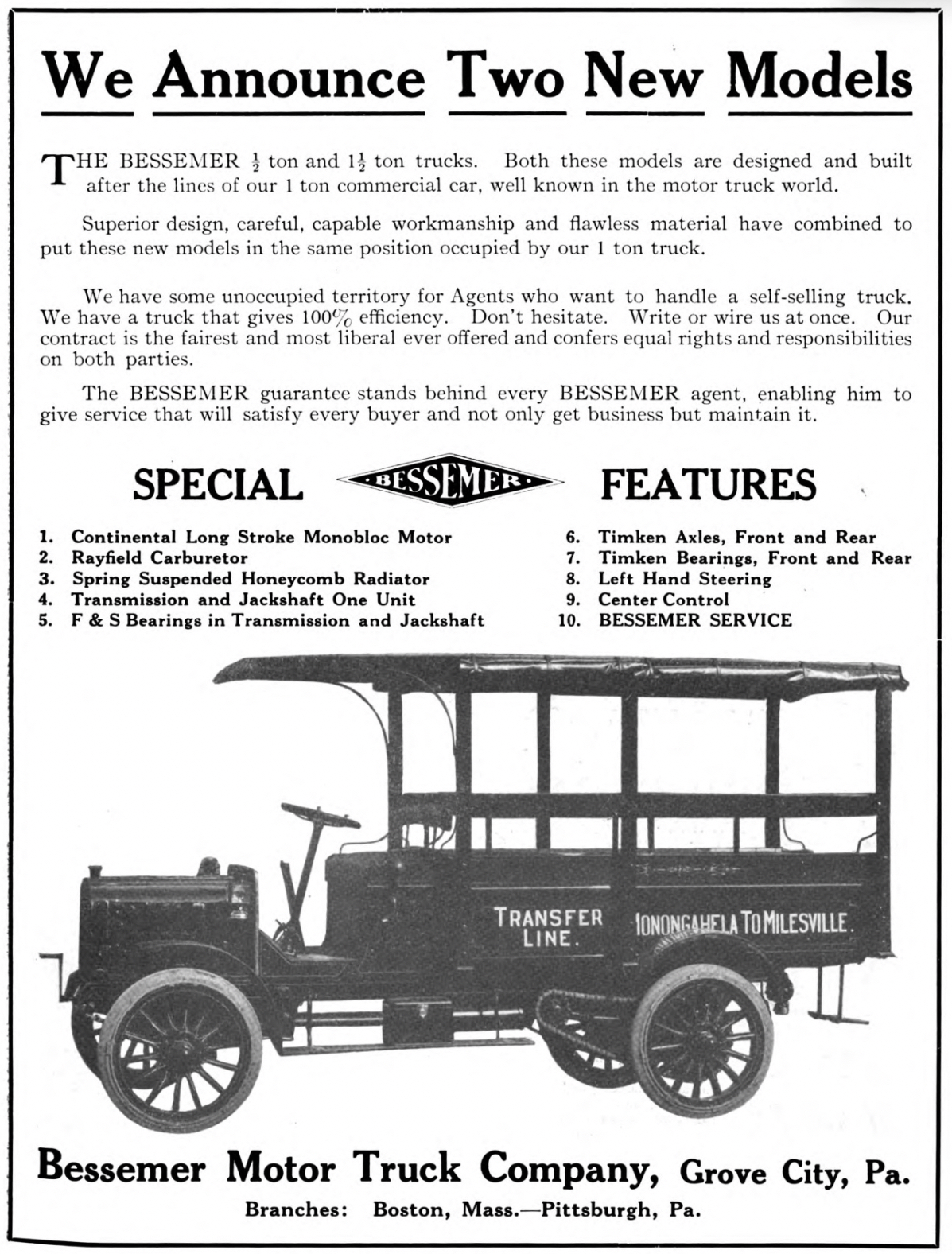
Bessemer advertisement (1912)

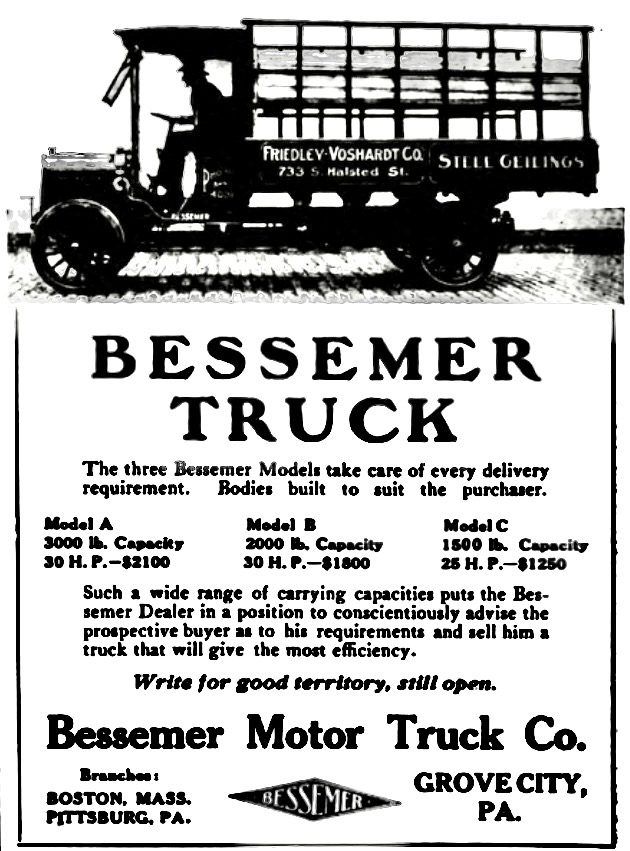
Bessemer Truck Model A,B,C (1913)

Bessemer advertisement (1920)

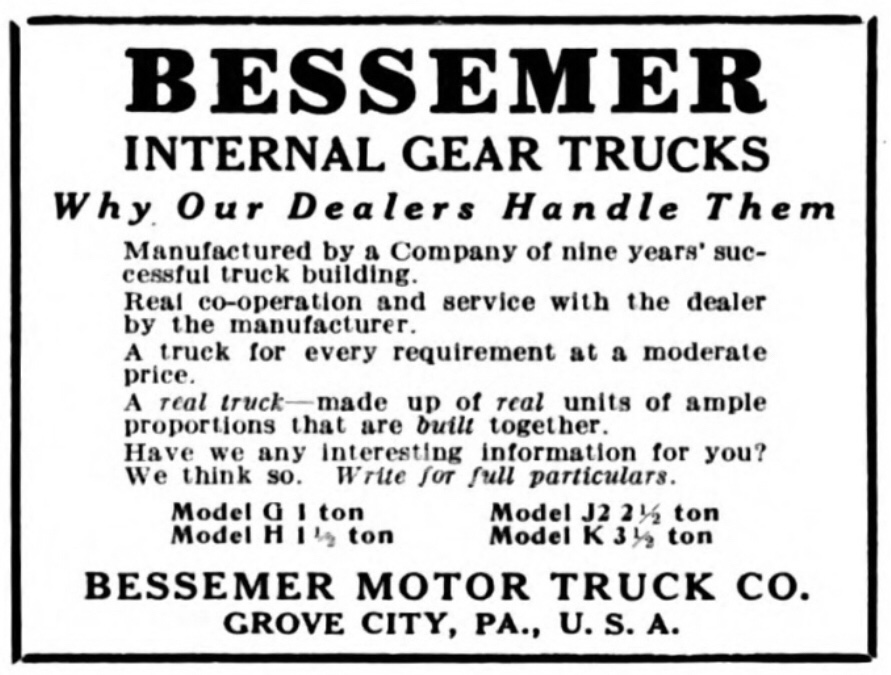
Bessemer advertisement (1921)

The company, founded on January 1, 1911, in Grove City, Pennsylvania, manufactured trucks and cars under the brand name Bessemer. The name of the company and its products goes back to the highly respected British engineer and inventor Sir Henry Bessemer (1813–1898). He became known for his method of decarburizing pig iron by blowing air or steam into it, patented as the "Bessemer converter". Apparently, the company's name was chosen arbitrarily, without any direct connection. The first models were the A, the B, and the C. Model A was a 1.4 t with 30 hp. Model B was a 0.9 t with 30 hp, and Model C was a 0.7 t with 25 hp. The Model C had an engine displacement of 3153 cc with a bore of 88.9 mm and a stroke of 127 mm. The Model A and Model B had a displacement of 4599 cc with a bore of 104.775 mm and a stroke of 133.35 mm. Vehicle production was 3 trucks per week in 1912. Buses were also manufactured. One example from 1915 has survived in Australia.

== Products ==
- Model A
- Model B
- Model C
- Model G (1 t)
- Model H (1.5 t)
- Model J2 (2.5 t)
- Model K (3.5t)
