= Walker Motor Car Company =

Defunct American motor vehicle manufacturer

- Company type: Automobile Manufacturing
- Industry: Automotive
- Genre: Runabouts
- Founded: 1905
- Defunct: 1906
- Headquarters: Detroit, Michigan, United States
- Area served: United States
- Products: Vehicles; Automotive parts

The Walker Motor Car Company was active from 1905 to 1906 in Detroit, Michigan.

== Advertisements ==
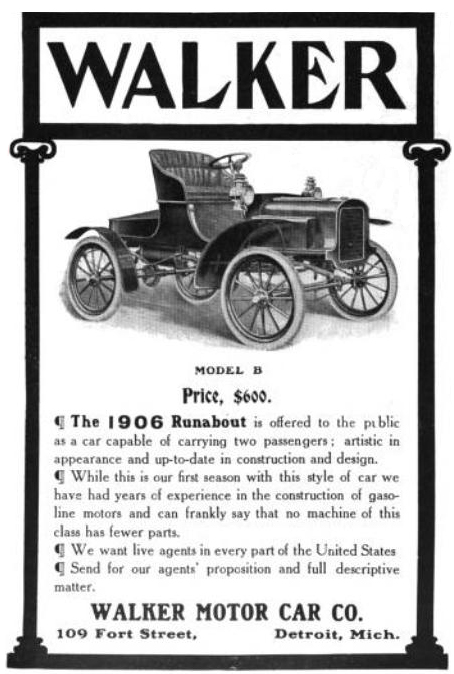
Walker Motor Car Co. of Detroit, Michigan - 1906
