= Kenworth 10-ton 6x6 heavy wrecking truck =

Heavy Wrecking Truck M1
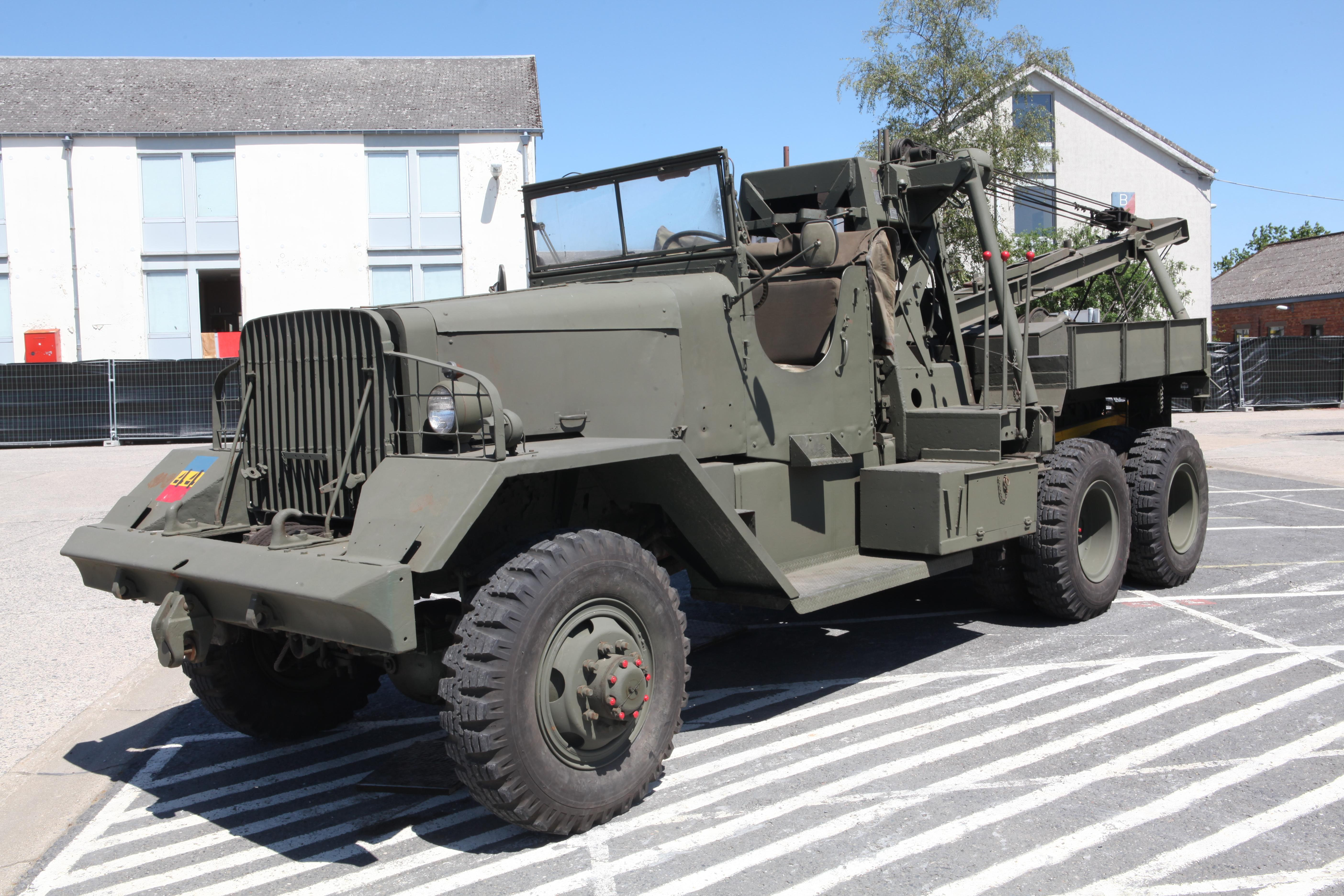
- Ward LaFrance M1A1
- Type: 10-ton 6x6 wrecker
- Place of origin: United States

Production history
- Designer: Corbitt
- Manufacturer: Kenworth, Ward LaFrance
- Produced: 1941-1945
- No. built: 5,765 (all models)
- Variants: M1A1

Specifications (M1A1)
- Mass: 31,200 lb (14,200 kg)
- Length: 23 ft 5 in (7.14 m)
- Width: 8 ft 3 in (2.51 m)
- Height: 9 ft 9 in (2.97 m)
- Engine: Continental 22-R; 145 hp (108 kW)
- Transmission: 5 speed x 2 range trf. case
- Suspension: Live axles on leaf springs
- Operational range: 250 mi (402.3 km)
- Maximum speed: 45 mph (72 km/h)

The Kenworth 10-ton 6x6 heavy wrecking truck (G116) (officially Heavy Wrecking Truck M1) was the standard heavy wrecker of the US Army during World War II. It was replaced in the 1950s by 5-ton wreckers.

== History ==
In 1939-1941 the Army Ordnance Corps was developing a complete line of tactical trucks that could operate over all roads and cross-country terrain in all weather. Corbitt, a small company which had sold trucks to the US Army since 1917, was working on designs for heavy-duty conventional 6x6s trucks. In 1940 their designs for a 6-ton truck and a 10-ton wrecker chassis were standardized; Corbitt was to build 6-ton cargo trucks, while the 10-ton wreckers were contracted to Kenworth Motor Truck Corp. and Ward LaFrance Truck Corp. Ward LaFrance began production in 1941 and would build 4,925 vehicles. Kenworth began in 1942, but because of interruptions in manufacturing only built 840. At first the manufacturers' chassis were similar and used the same components. After the 1943 upgrade to -A1 standard, the two chassis were mechanically identical and parts were interchangeable. After the war, the rating of the 10-ton wrecker was lowered to 6-ton.

== Engine and driveline ==
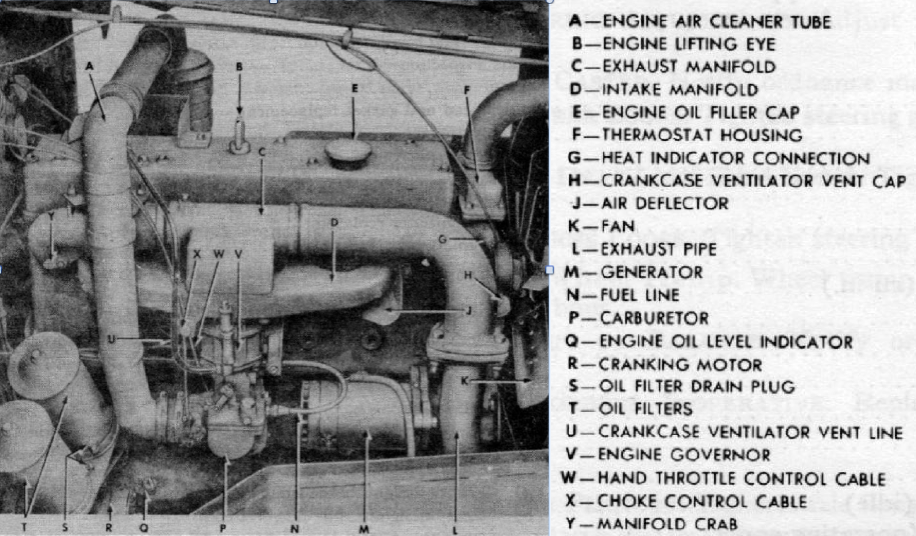
Continental 22-R

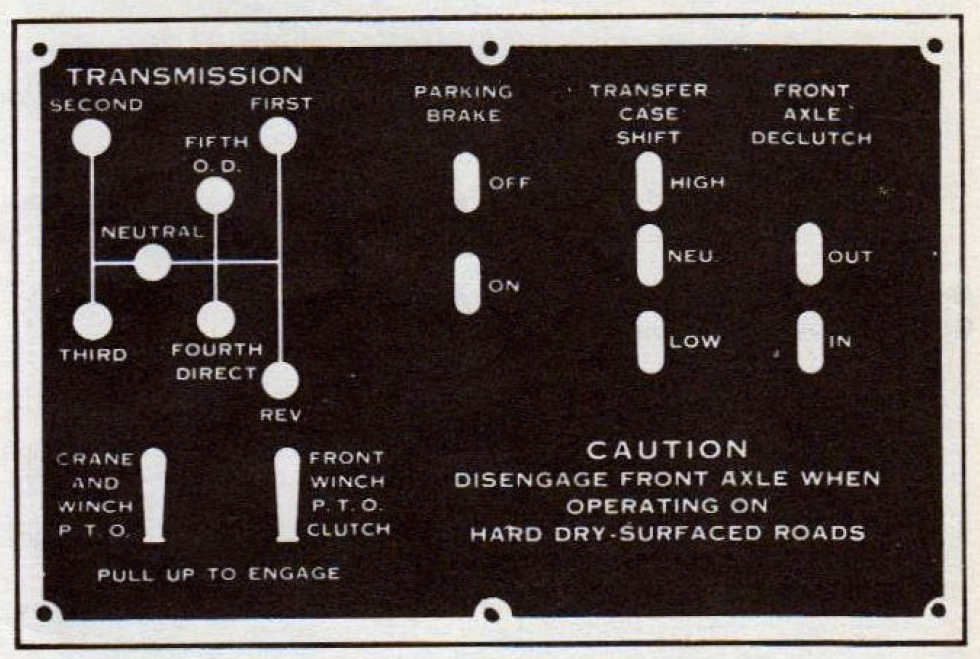
M1A1 shift plate

A Continental 22-R engine was used by all trucks. This 501 cu in (8.2 L) overhead valve inline 6 cylinder gasoline engine developed 145 hp (108 kW) at 2400 rpm and 372 lbf⋅ft (504 N⋅m) of torque.

The 5-speed manual Fuller transmission had a very low 1st gear, was direct in 4th and had an overdrive 5th. A separate 2-speed transfer case also engaged or disengaged the front axle.

== Chassis ==
The M1 had a ladder frame with three live beam axles, the front on leaf springs, the rear tandem on leaf springs with locating arms. All models had a 181 in (4.60 m) wheelbase. The M1 weighed 27,330 lb (12,400 kg), the -A1 31,200 lb (14,200 kg). Brakes were full air, the tires were 11.00x20 with dual rear tires.

In addition to the wrecking body, all trucks had a 20,000 lb (9,100 kg) front winch and a rear pintle hitch. Not intended to carry a load, the M1 could support 8,000 lb (3,600 kg) while towing up to 60,000 lb (27,000 kg). The -A1 upgrade also had a rear winch, heavier bumpers, and a large front tow-bar, allowing the truck to recover and move light armored vehicles.

== Bodies ==
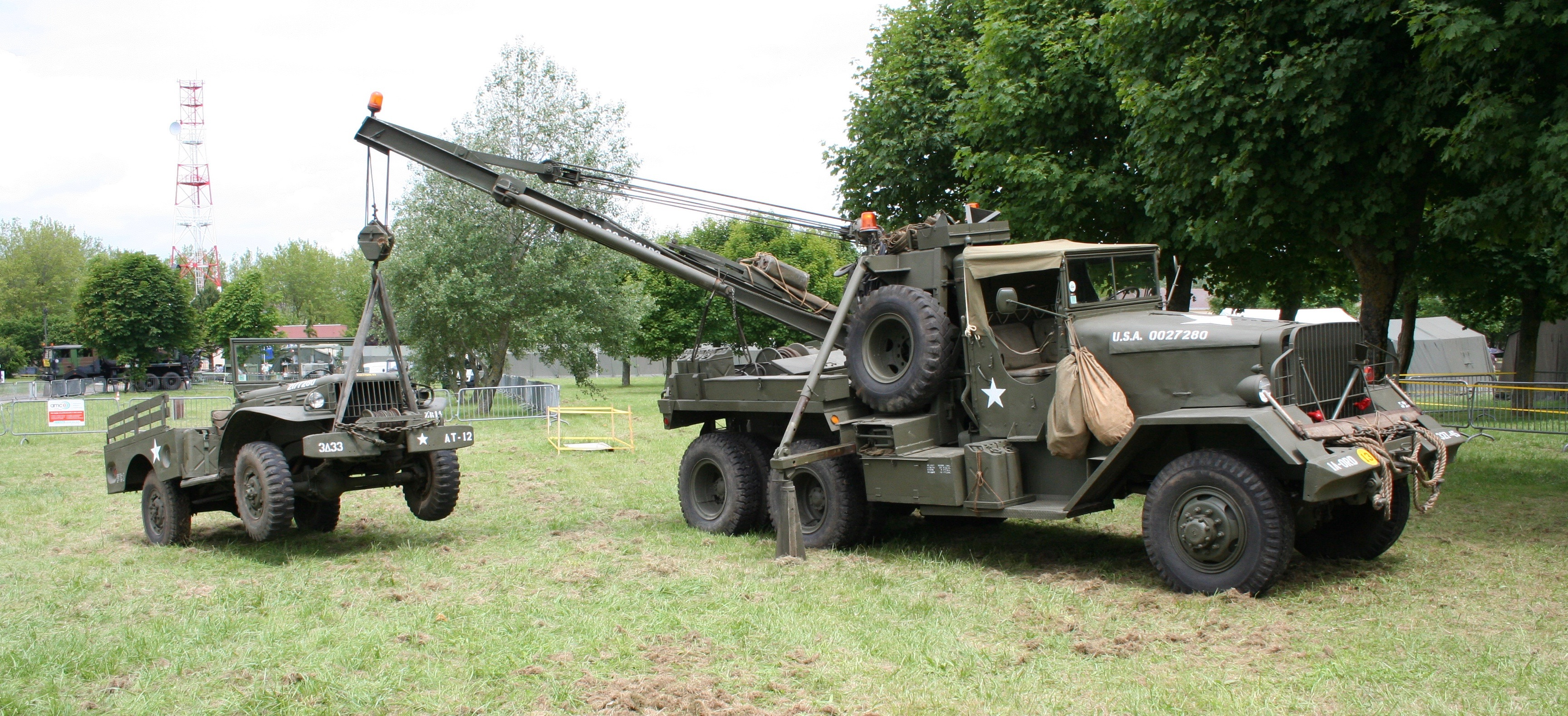
M1A1 lifting a Dodge WC52 3/4-ton truck

Early models used the manufacturer's commercial cab, fenders, and specific hoods, making the two models look different. The -A1 models had open military cabs, flat fenders, and similar hoods, making all look the same.

All bodies used by both manufacturers were built by Garwood. A single boom could be raised and lowered by cable, rotate 180°, and carried a cable from a 47,500 lb (21,500 kg) winch. Outriggers and braces on both the body and the boom itself allowed 16,000 lb (7,300 kg) to be lifted throughout the rear 180° of the truck. In early models, all actions except for the winches were manual; later models had powered booms. The -A1 upgrade had a different boom and the front sides of the body were cut away from the mast and spare tires.

== Gallery ==
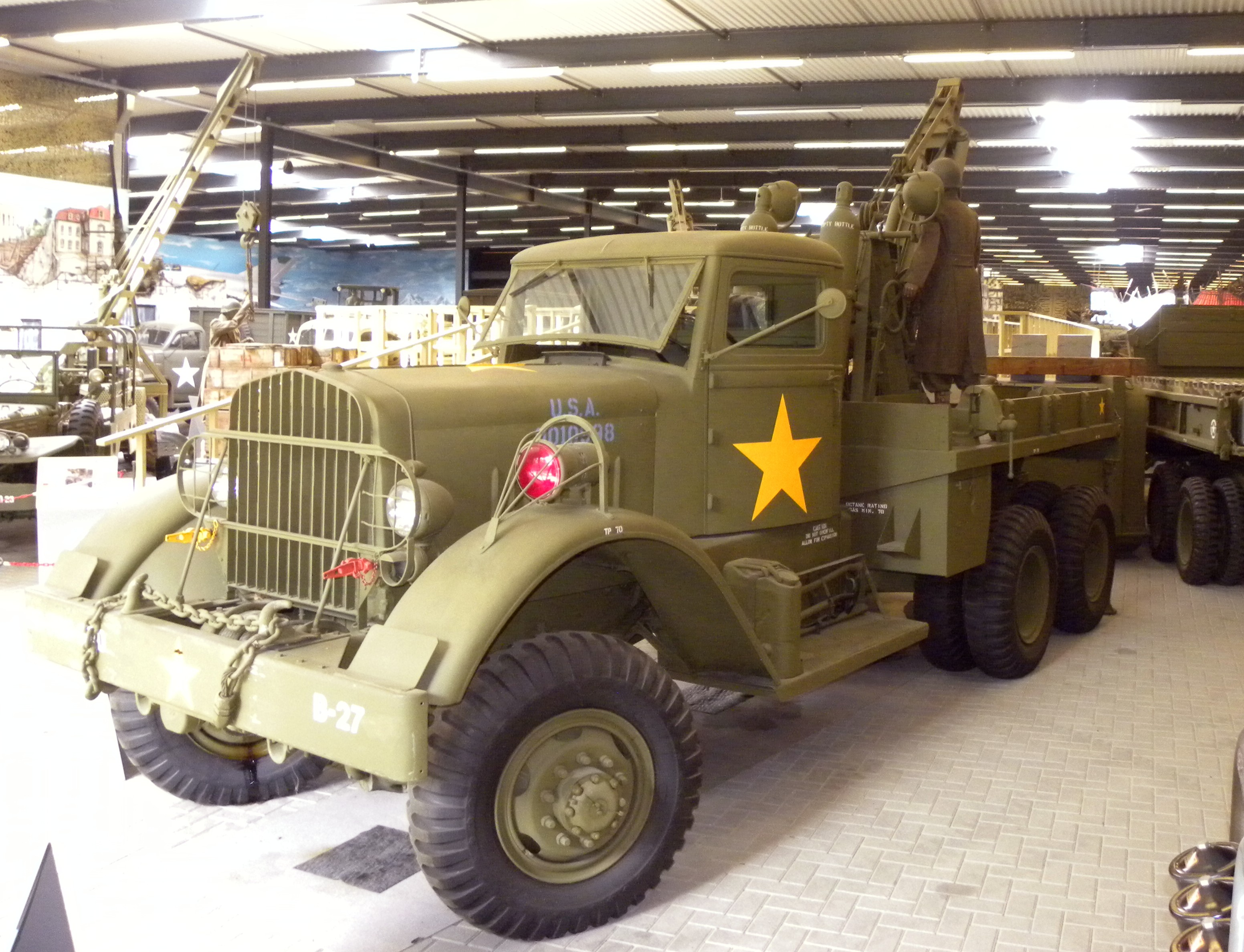
M1 (1942)

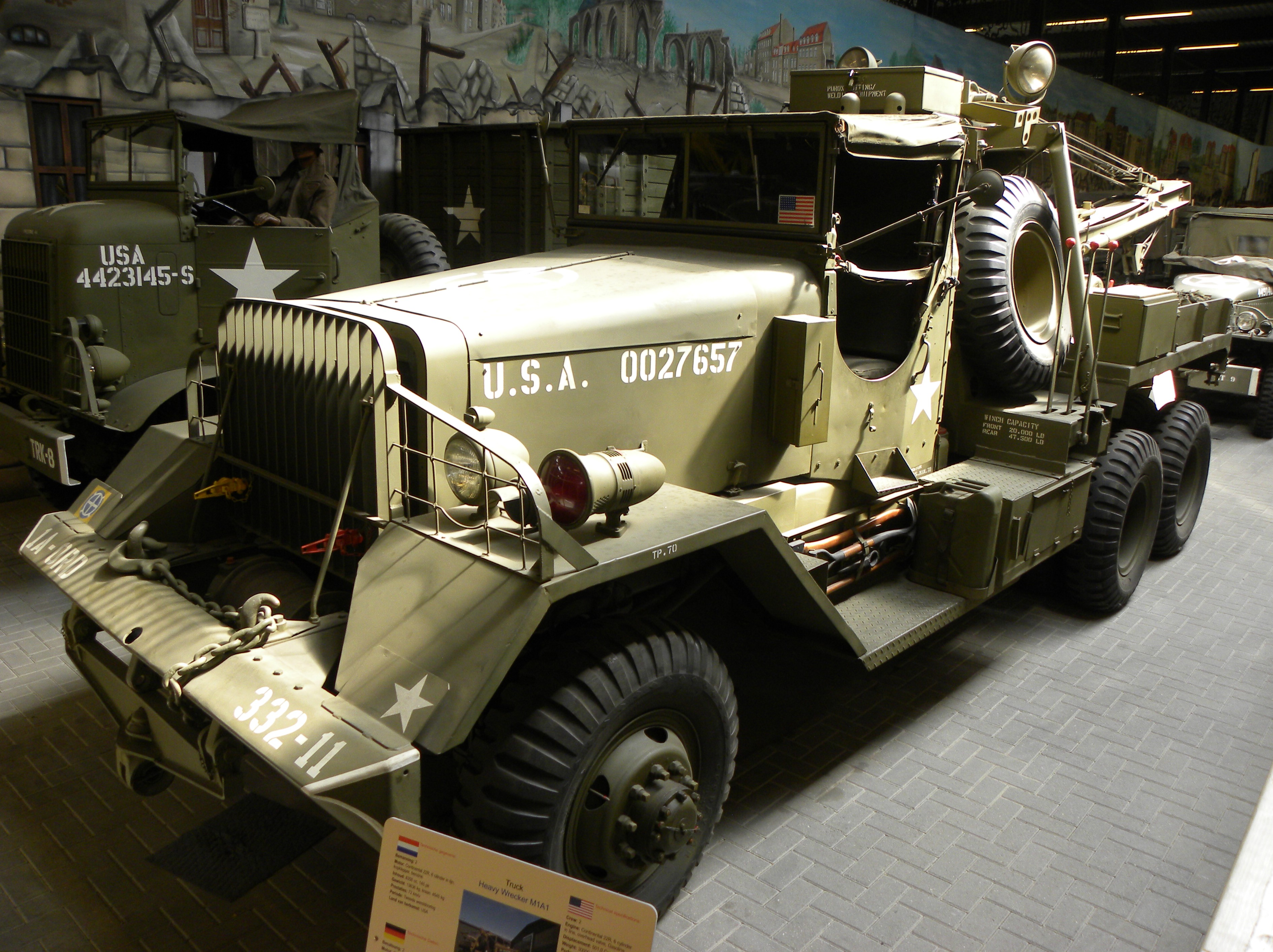
M1A1 (1944)

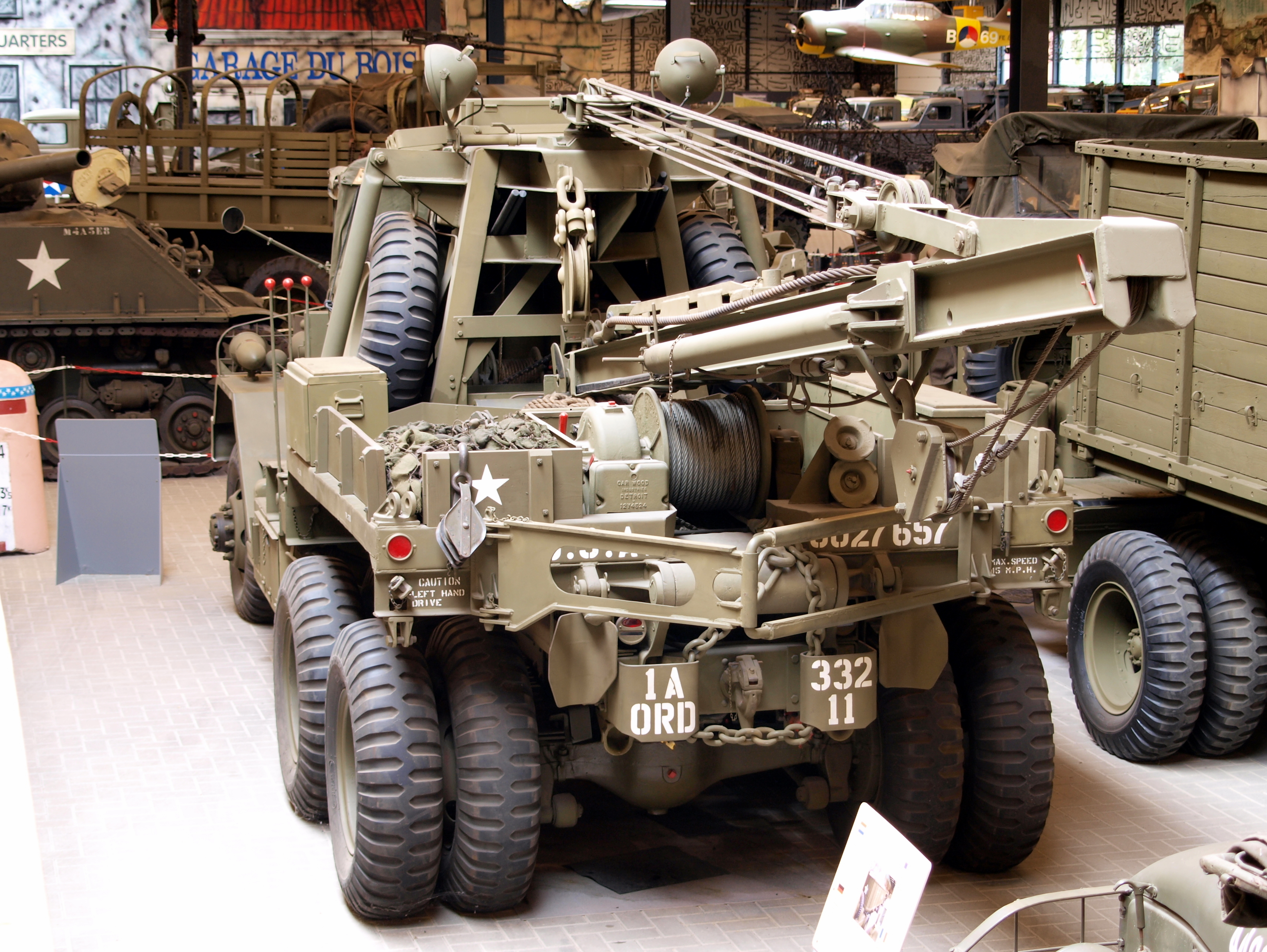
M1A1 body
