= 6-ton 6×6 truck =

US military truck

6-ton 6×6 Truck
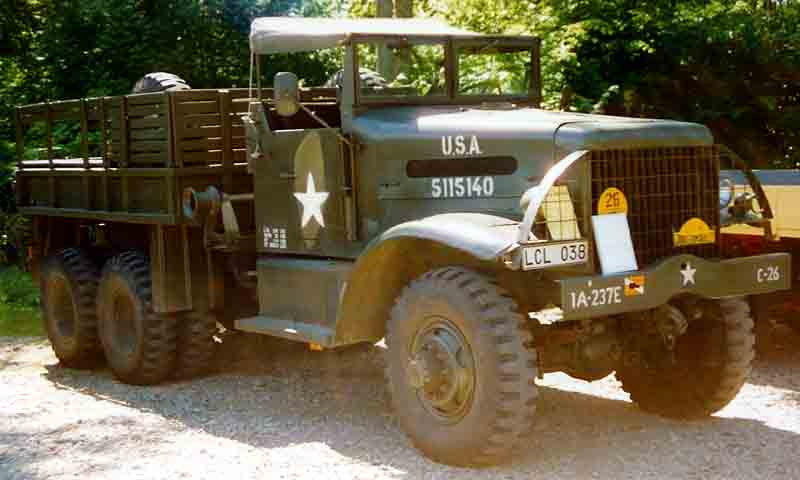
- Prime Mover Cargo Truck (White)
- Type: 6-ton 6×6 truck
- Place of origin: United States

Production history
- Designer: Corbitt
- Manufacturer: Brockway, Corbitt, FWD, Ward LaFrance, White
- Produced: 1941–1945
- No. built: 219,882

Specifications (Prime mover)
- Mass: 22,900 lb (10,400 kg) (empty)
- Length: 24 feet 1 inch (7.34 m)
- Width: 8 feet (2.44 m)
- Height: 9 feet 6 inches (2.90 m)
- Engine: Hercules HXD; 202 hp (151 kW)
- Transmission: 4 speed × 2 range
- Suspension: Live beam axles on leaf springs
- Operational range: 200 mi (321.9 km)
- Maximum speed: 37 mph (60 km/h)

The 6-ton 6×6 truck (supply catalog designations G512, 514, 526, and 547) was a family of heavy tactical trucks built for the United States Army during World War II. It was designated a “6-ton” truck because the basic cargo version was designed to transport a 6-short ton (5,400 kg) cargo load over all terrain in all weather. The chassis were built by Brockway Motor Company, The Corbitt Company, The Four Wheel Drive Auto Company (FWD), Ward LaFrance Truck Corporation, and White Motor Company. They were replaced by the M54 5-ton 6x6 trucks in the 1950s.

== History ==
In 1939–1941 the Army Ordnance Corps was developing a complete line of tactical trucks that could operate over all roads and cross-country terrain in all weather. A 6-ton (5,400 kg) payload rated 6×6 truck to tow anti-aircraft artillery was needed. The Corbitt Company, a small company who had sold the US Army trucks since 1917, began delivering 200 prototypes in 1940. In 1941 their improved Model 50SD6, with a larger engine and different hood and fenders, was standardized and went into production, but White Motor Company soon became their largest producer. Brockway Motor Company began in 1942, and The Four Wheel Drive Auto Company (FWD) in 1945. Ward LaFrance also built the chassis. Seven body types were built, some by more than one manufacturer. All manufacturer's models were virtually identical, with very minor variations. Early models had closed cabs with full doors; in 1942 open cabs with half doors were introduced.

== Specifications ==
=== Engine and driveline ===
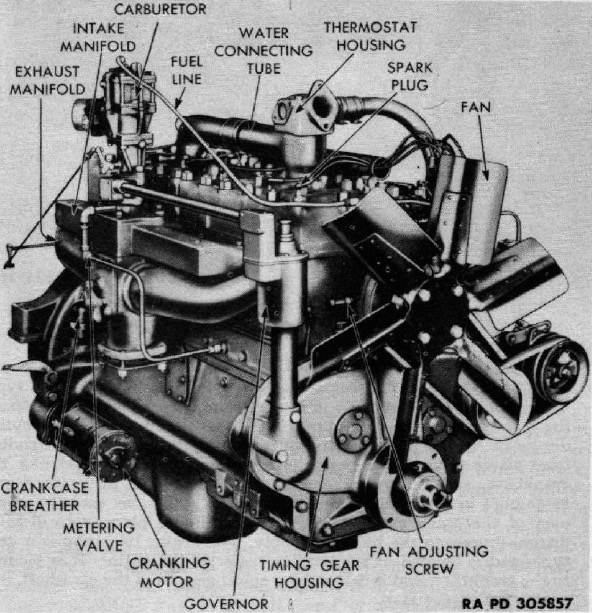
Hercules HXD (right front view)

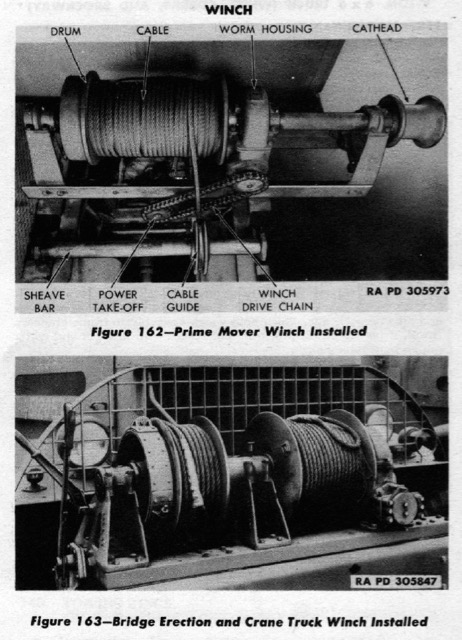

All standardized models used Hercules HXD engines, an 855 cu in (14.0 L) displacement L-head inline 6 cylinder gasoline engine developing 202 hp (151 kW) at 2100 rpm and 642 lbf⋅ft (870 N⋅m) of torque at 900 rpm.

A Fuller 4-speed manual non-synchronized transmission with a very low 1st and direct 4th gear was used. A Timken transfer case had a high and low range, a neutral for Power take-off (PTO) operation, and engaged the front axle. Rear axles were Timken double reduction "pumpkin" type; tractors had heavier rear axles.

=== Chassis ===
Most models had a ladder frame with three live axles, the front on leaf springs, the rear tandem leaf springs with locating arms. The exception was the crane truck, which had a walking beam rear suspension for stability.

There were three wheelbases. The short, used for prime movers, was 185 inches (4.70 m); the long, used for cranes, was 197 inches (5.00 m); and the extra long, used for bridge erectors, was 220 inches (5.59 m) (measurements are from the centerline of the front axle to the centerline of the rear tandem).

Prime movers and tankers had 10.00×22 size tires, while bridge, crane, and semi-tractor trucks had 14.00×20s with a larger cross-section. All had dual rear tires. Brakes were full air with drum brakes on all wheels. Prime movers had adjustable electrical brake connections for trailer brakes.

Prime movers had a 25,000 lb (11,000 kg) winch behind the cab, most other trucks had a front-mounted two-drum winch for self-recovery. Trucks converted from prime mover chassis had no winch at all.

== Models ==
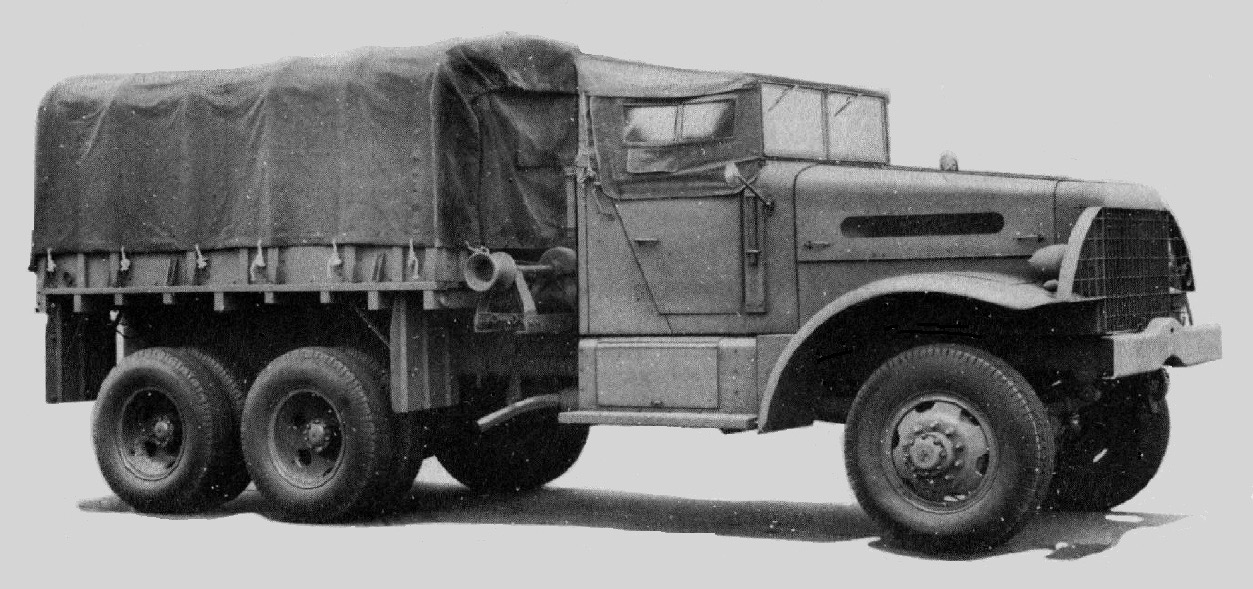
Prime Mover Cargo Truck

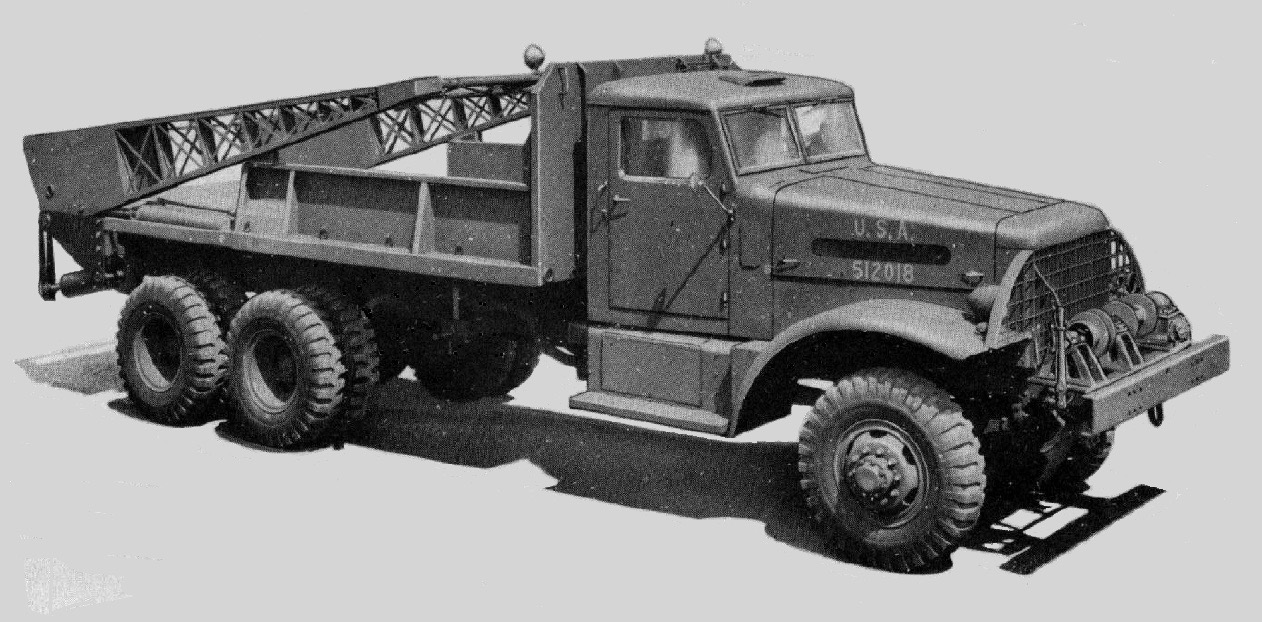
Bridge Erection Truck

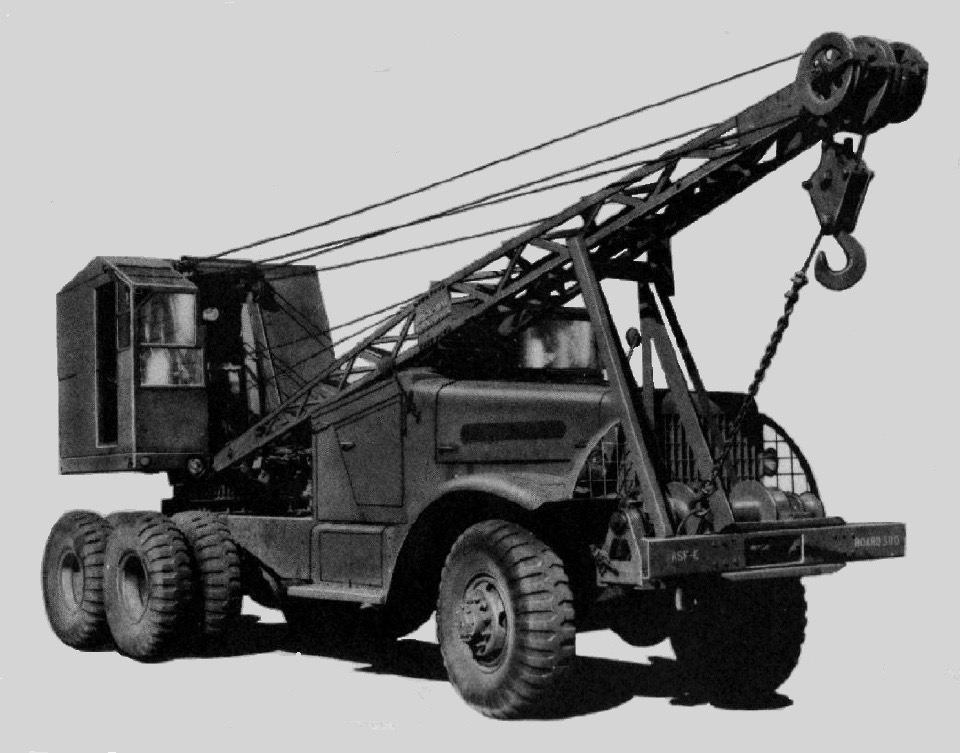
Crane Trucks

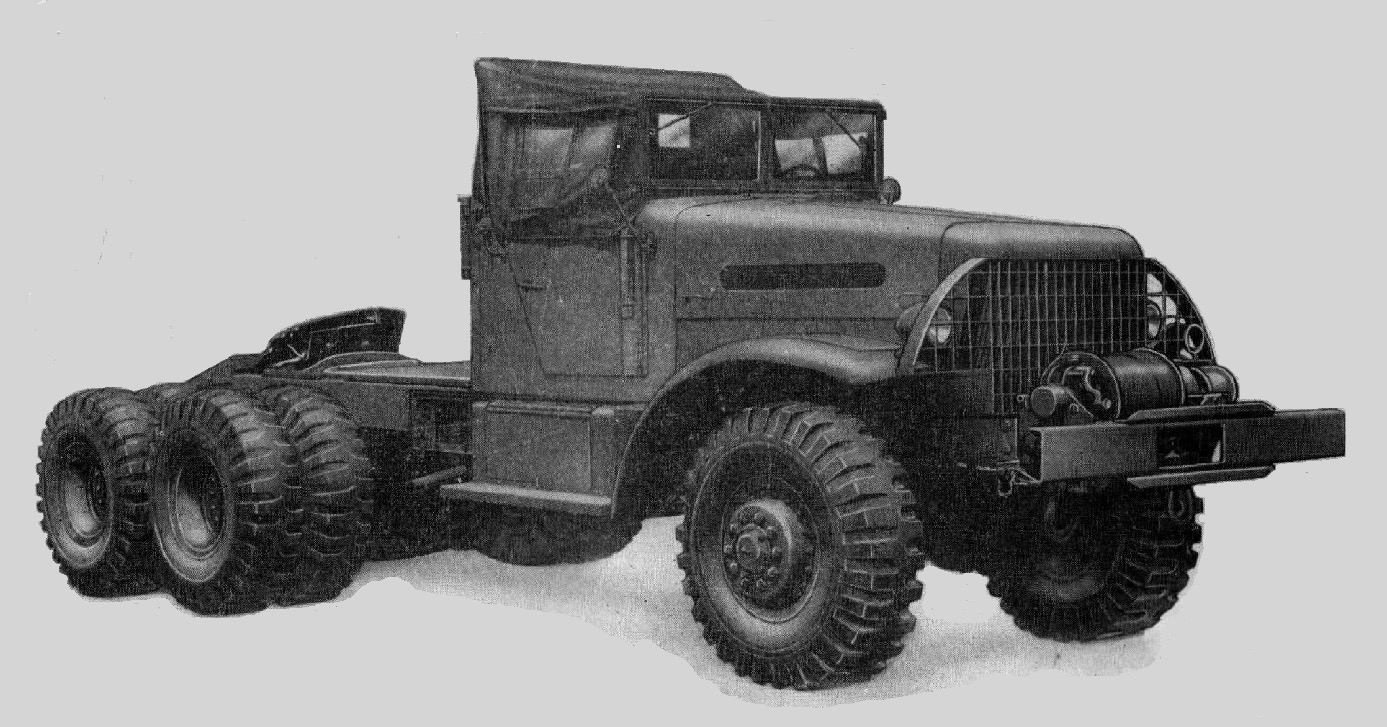
Tractor Truck

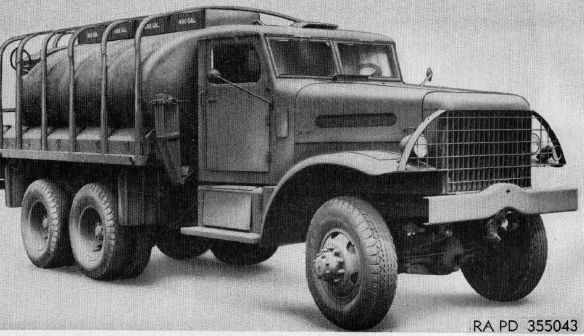
Gasoline Tank Truck

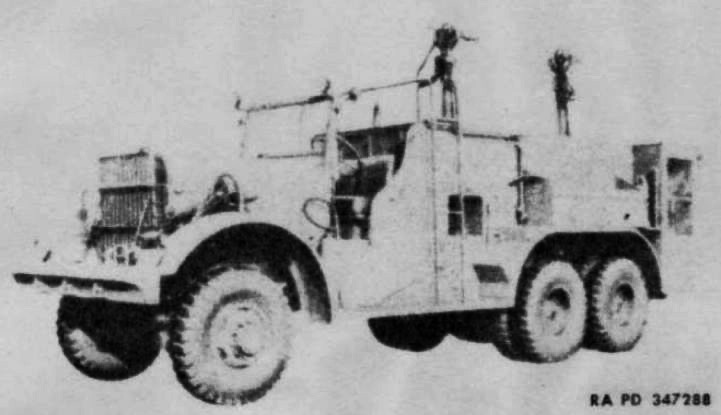
Fire Crash Truck

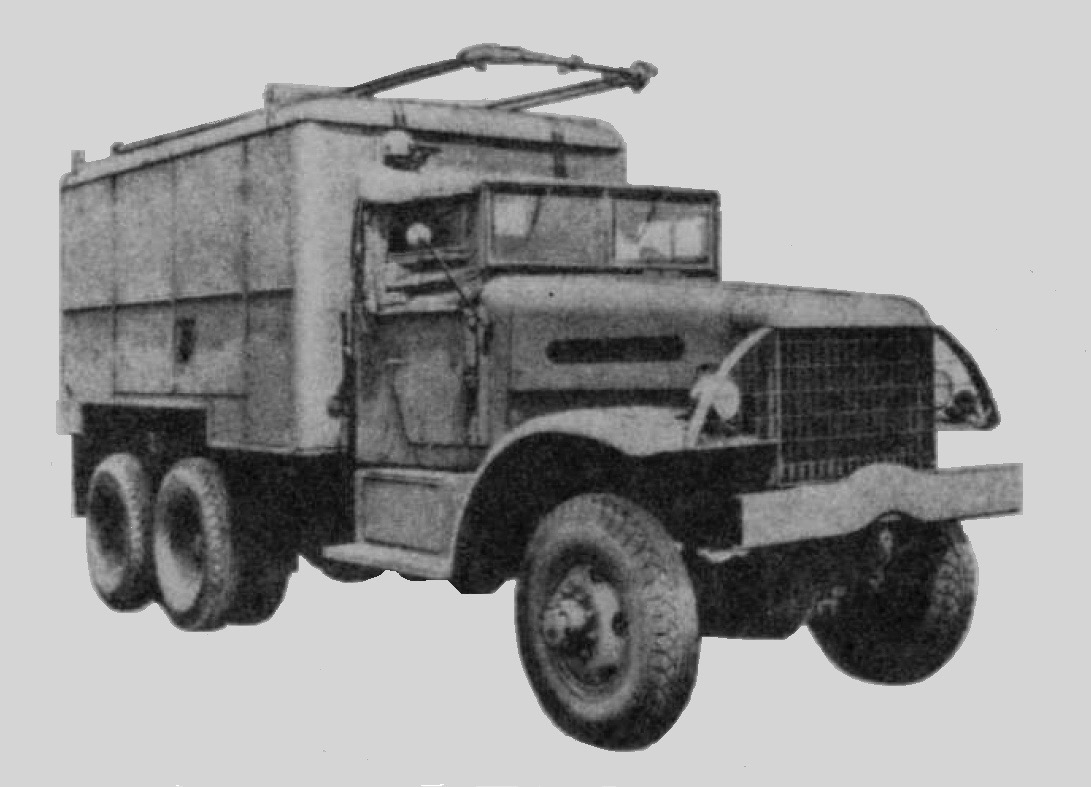
Prime Mover Van Truck

=== Prime mover cargo truck ===
Prime movers were used to tow field artillery pieces, they also transported gun crews, equipment, and ammunition. They had a pintle hitch at the rear for towing up to 40,000 lb (18,000 kg). Another pintle at the front could be used to emplace the piece. A mid-mounted 25,000 lb (11,000 kg) winch had a centered cable drum and a capstan on the right side. Pulleys and rollers routed the cable under the body and out the rear frame cross-member.

With a short wheelbase, mid-mounted winch, and short overhang, the body could only be 9 ft (2.74 m) feet long. Both sides had sideboards with fold down troop seats and bows for a tarpaulin. Two spare tires were mounted inside the body, one along each side. Early models had all steel bodies, in 1942 they were replaced by largely wood types to conserve steel. All Corbitts (3,077) were prime movers, White also built 3,547.

=== Bridge erection truck ("Treadway truck") ===
Built on a long, reinforced chassis, they were used to carry treadway pontoon bridges for Engineer Combat Battalions. A large double arm hydraulic boom built by Heil was used to self unload components, often directly into a river. A 25,000 lb (11,000 kg) winch was mounted at the front. They had an auxiliary air compressor and large reservoir tanks, used to inflate pontoon floats. Brockway built 1,166, White 1,152, Ward LaFrance 589, and FWD 168.

=== Crane truck ===
Quickway cranes were used by combat engineers to unload and assemble bridge components. The rotating crane was powered by an auxiliary IHC 334 cu in (5.5 L) inline 4 cylinder engine developing 35 hp (26 kW). As a derrick it could lift 13,000 lb (5,900 kg) at a minimum radius of 10 ft (3.05 m) and 5,550 lb (2,520 kg) at a maximum radius of 25 ft (7.62 m). A shovel, clamshell, dragline, and drilling equipment could also be used. The cab had a windshield on the left side only, in transit the boom went over the right side and was braced to the front bumper. A 25,000 lb (11,000 kg) winch was mounted on the front. Brockway built 1,224.

=== Tractor truck ===
As artillery pieces were being towed more often by tracked vehicles, prime mover chassis became available for other uses. In 1945 White built 112 semi-tractors with a fifth wheel and heavier rated Timken axles. Tire size was 14.00×20. Maximum speed was 40 mph (64 km/h), the highest in the series. A 25,000 lb (11,000 kg) winch was mounted on the front.

=== Gasoline tank truck ===
Wanting a fuel tanker larger than the CCKW, the Army ordered 25 from White. The body had 4 self-sealing tank compartments for a total of 2,000 US gal (7,600 L). A bow and canvas top was fitted, so the truck could be disguised as a common cargo truck. Early trucks had a hard cab and a front-mounted pintle hitch, later trucks had an open cab and a 25,000 lb (11,000 kg) front winch. A 2,000 US gal (7,600 L) gallon trailer could be towed. No follow up orders were made.

=== Fire crash truck ===
Fire Crash trucks were used by the US Army Air Force to fight fires from airplane crashes. Brockway and Ward LaFrance chassis were equipped with bodies by Mack and American LaFrance (a separate company), both had auxiliary engines for the pump. This allowed the truck to move while two foam nozzles were being used. American LaFrance used their own 12 cylinder engine and 4 stage pump. Mack used a Continental R-6602 developing 225 hp (168 kW) to drive a Hale centrifugal pump capable of 325 US gal/min (1,230 L/min) at 500 psi (3,400,000 Pa).

=== Prime mover van truck ===
White built communication vans for the Army Air Force on the prime mover wheelbase. Bodies were from Superior and Thomas. They were used to tow and power the SCR-545-A anti-aircraft radar set. White built 1,870.

== Dimensions ==
| Model Manufacturer | Wheelbase | Length | Width | Height | Weight empty |
|---|---|---|---|---|---|
| Prime Mover; Corbitt | short | 23 ft 9 in (7.24 m) | 8 ft (2.44 m) | 9 ft 10 in (3.00 m) | 22,020 lb (9,990 kg) |
| Bridge; Brockway | extra long | 30 ft 10 in (9.40 m) | 8 ft 4 in (2.54 m) | 9 ft (2.74 m) | 26,500 lb (12,000 kg) |
| Crane; Brockway | long | 34 ft 8 in (10.57 m) | 8 ft 4 in (2.54 m) | 11 ft 4 in (3.45 m) | 35,275 lb (16,000 kg) |
| Tractor; White | short | 23 ft 3 in (7.09 m) | 8 ft 5 in (2.57 m) | 9 ft 5 in (2.87 m) | 22,070 lb (10,010 kg) |
| Tank; White | short | 23 ft 10 in (7.26 m) | 8 ft 2 in (2.49 m) | 8 ft (2.44 m) | 23,820 lb (10,800 kg) |
| Fire Crash; Brockway | long | 29 ft 7 in (9.02 m) | 8 ft 8 in (2.64 m) | 12 ft 6 in (3.81 m) | 31,200 lb (14,200 kg) |
| Van; White | short | 24 ft (7.32 m) | 8 ft (2.44 m) | 10 ft 5 in (3.18 m) | 21,200 lb (9,600 kg) |

== Bibliography ==
- Crismon, Fred W (2001). US Military Wheeled Vehicles (3 ed.). Victory WW2. pp. 9, 363, 368–370.
- Doyle, David (2003). Standard Catalog of U.S. Military Vehicles (2 ed.). Krause. pp. 208–212.
- Doyle, David (2015). Six-Ton Trucks. Ampersand.
- TM 5-272 Steel Treadway Bridge M2 (PDF). US War Dept. 1944.
- TM 9-813 6-ton 6x6 Truck (White, Corbit, and Brockway). US War Dept. 1944.
- TM 9-2800 Military Vehicles (PDF). US Dept. of the Army. 1947. pp. 29, 305–308.
