= Brockway Motor Company =

Builder of custom trucks in Cortland, New York, 1912-1977

Brockway
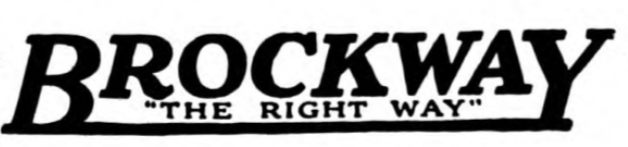
- Industry: Automotive
- Founded: 1909; 117 years ago
- Founder: George Brockway
- Defunct: 1977; 49 years ago
- Headquarters: Cortland, New York
- Products: trucks

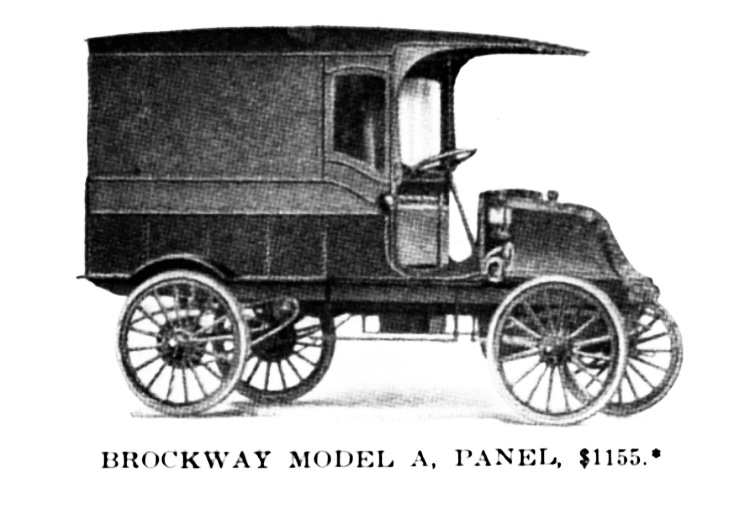
Brockway Model A (1912-1913) The Model A had a three-cylinder engine with a 4 inch (101.6 mm) bore and 5 inch (127 mm) stroke, for a displacement of 188.5 cubic inches (3089 cc). The engine produced 32 hp (24 kW).

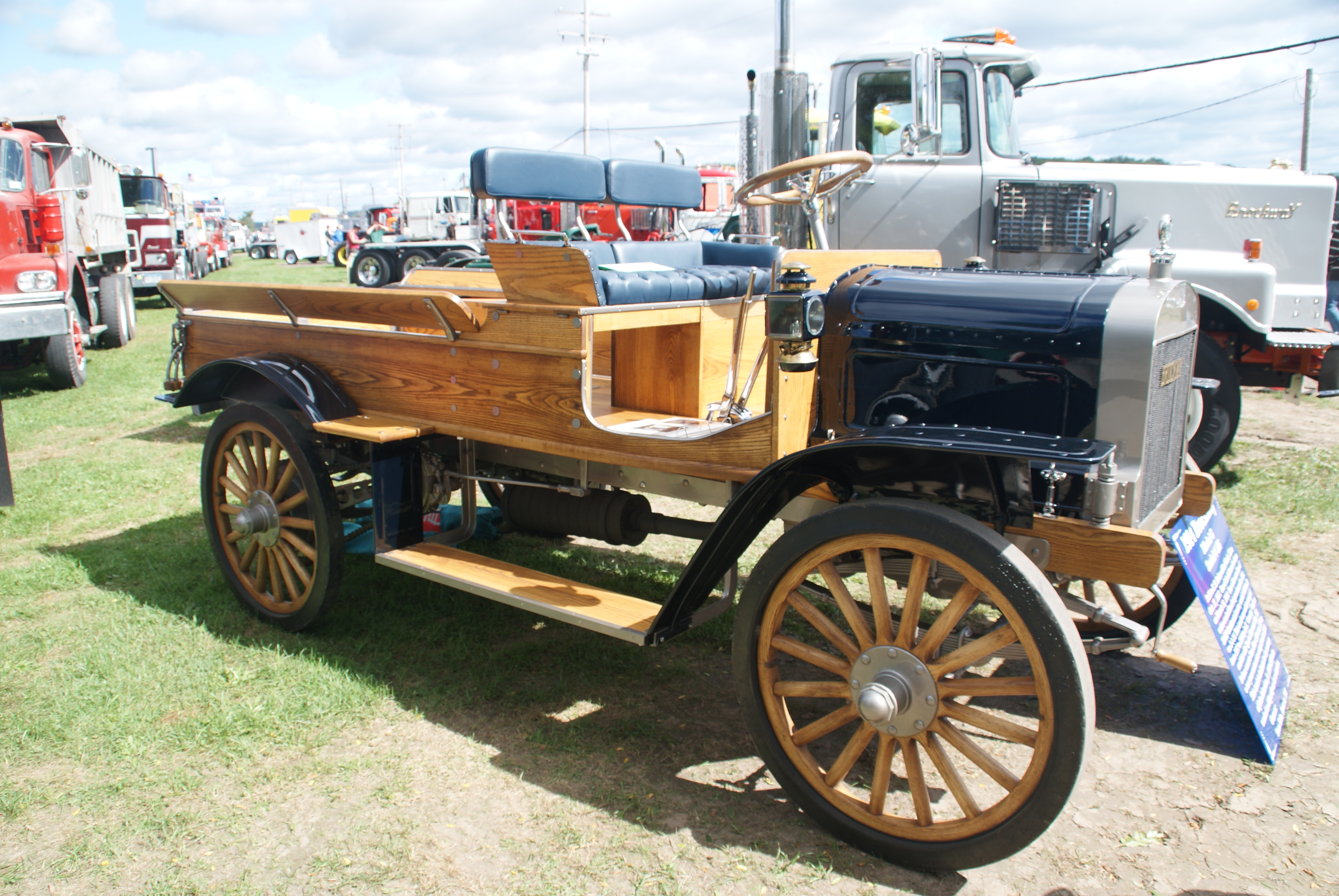
1914 Brockway model G with Continental engine

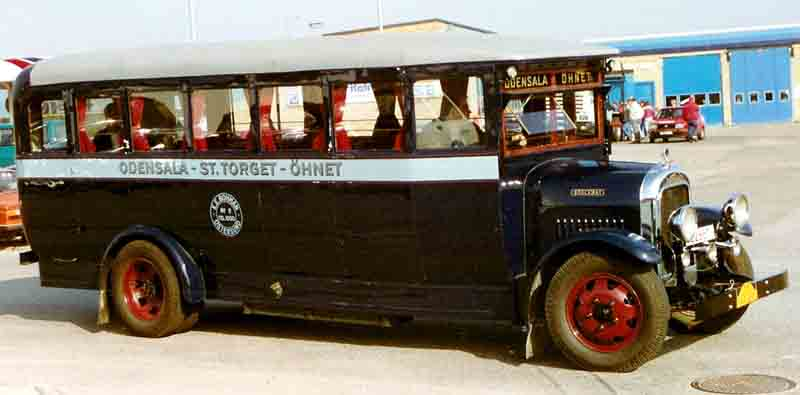
1929 Brockway Bus

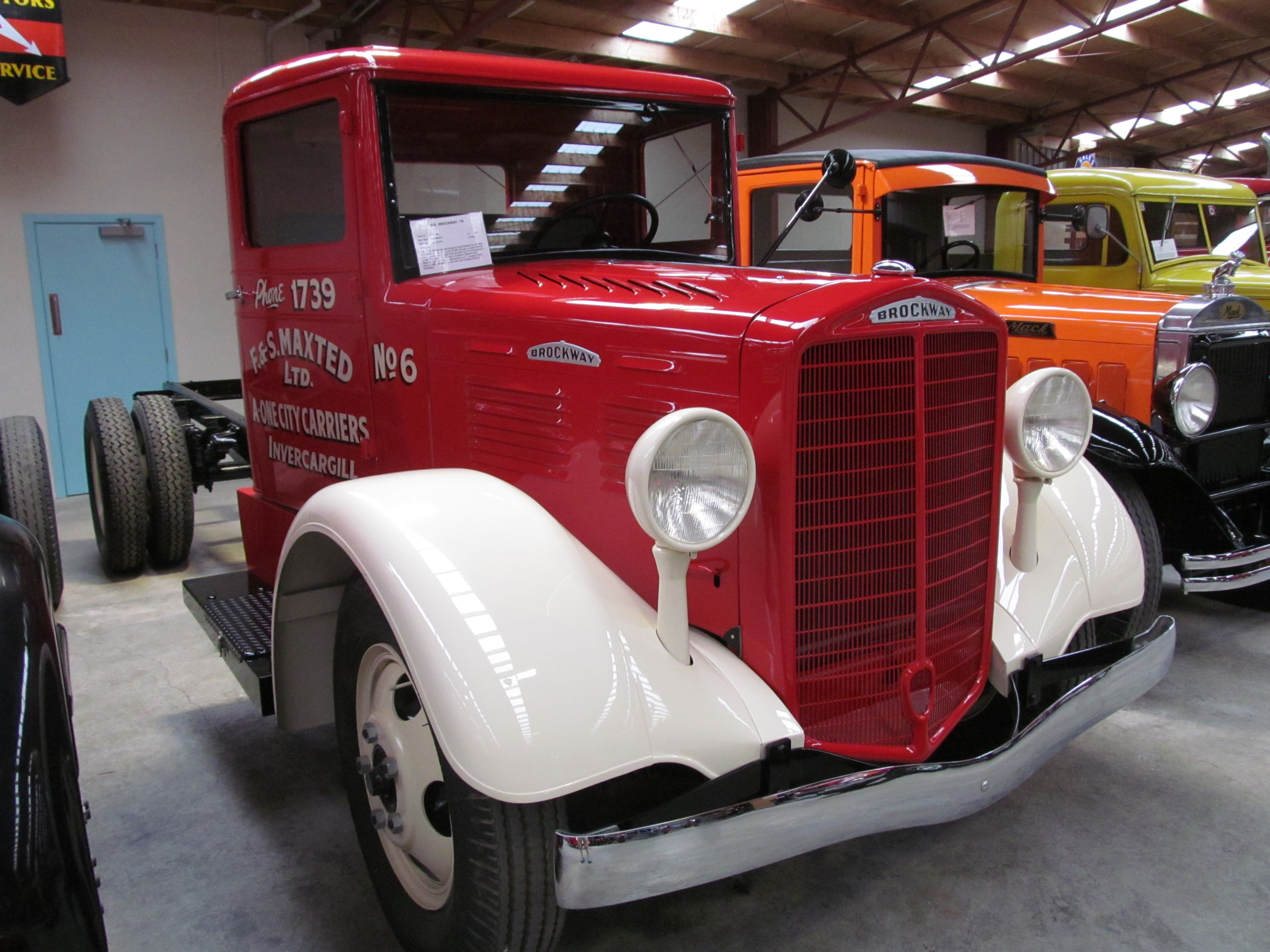
1945 Brockway 78

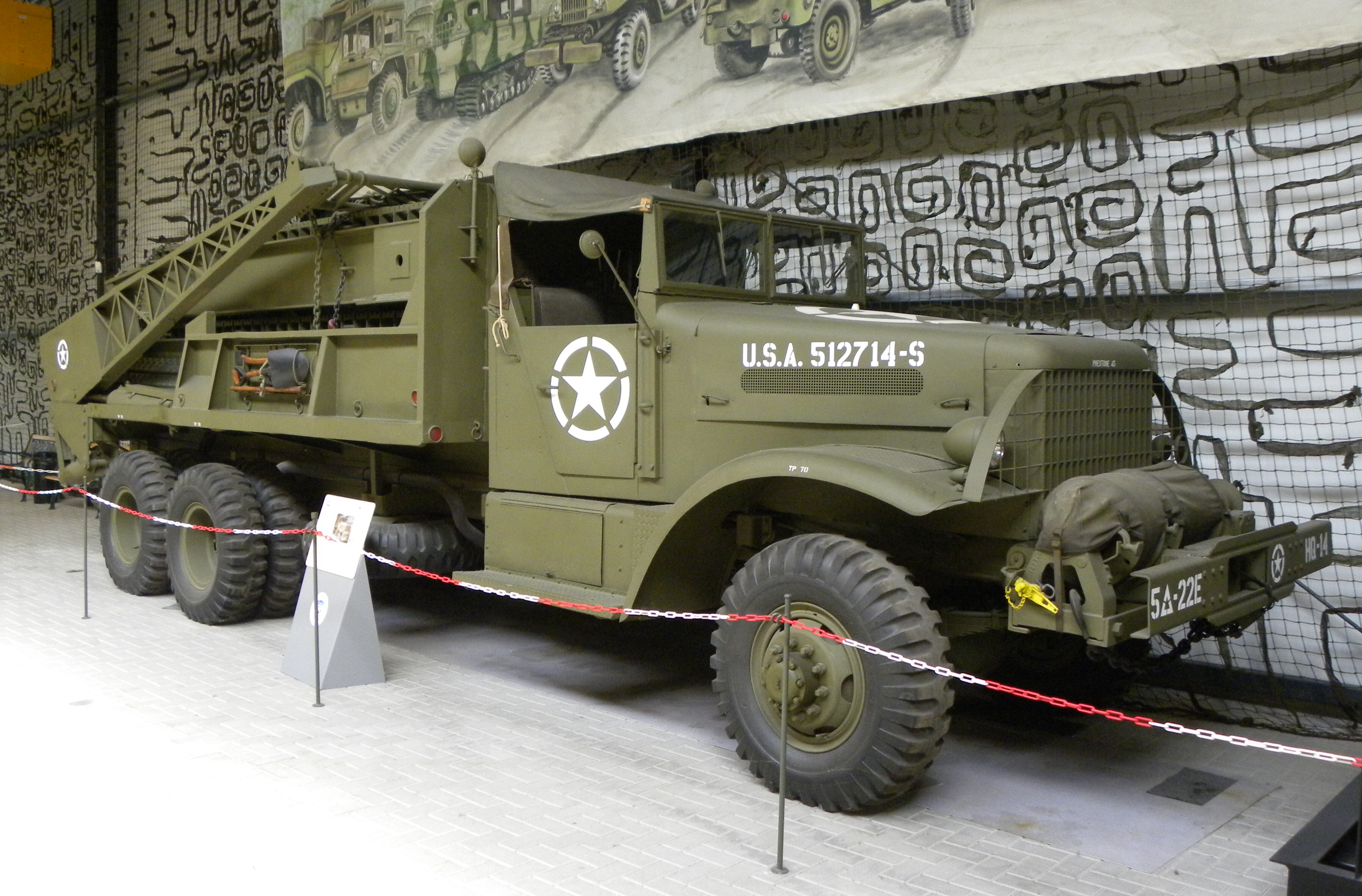
G690 "Treadway" 6 ton 6×6

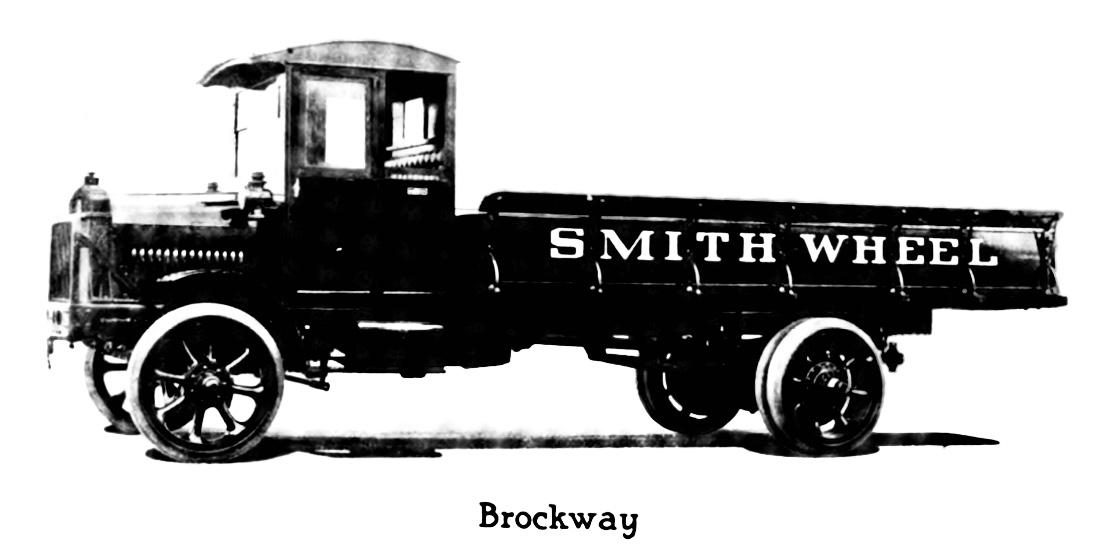
Brockway T (1920-1924)

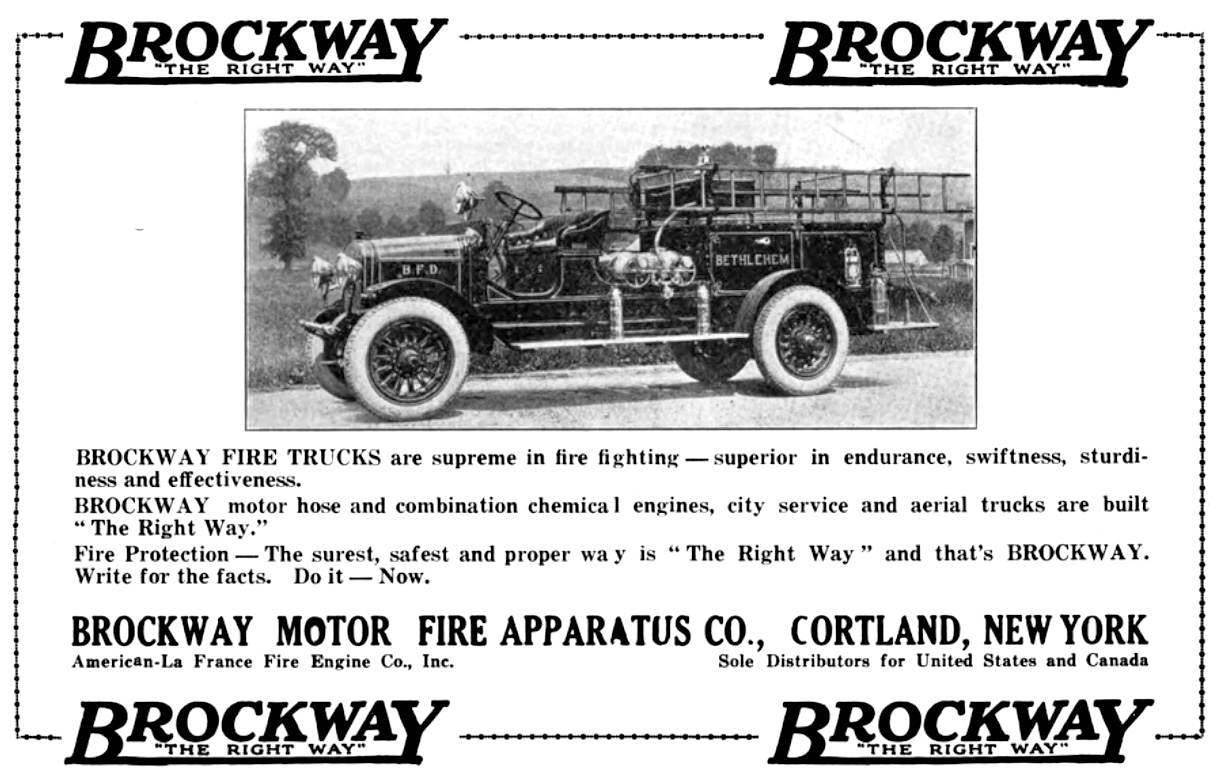
Brockway Firetruck (1922)

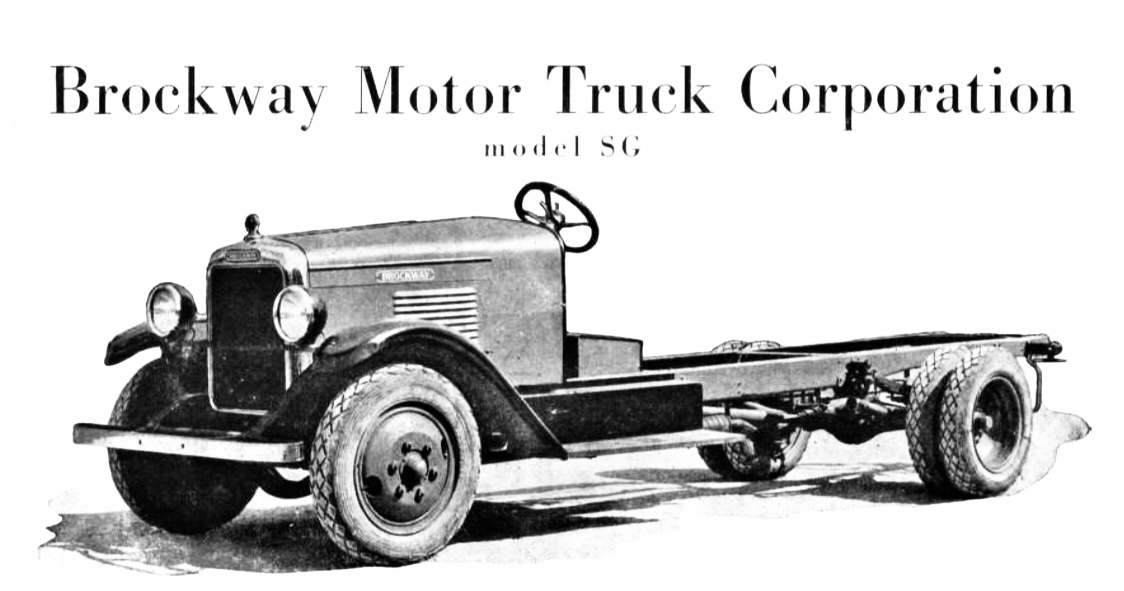
Brockway model SG

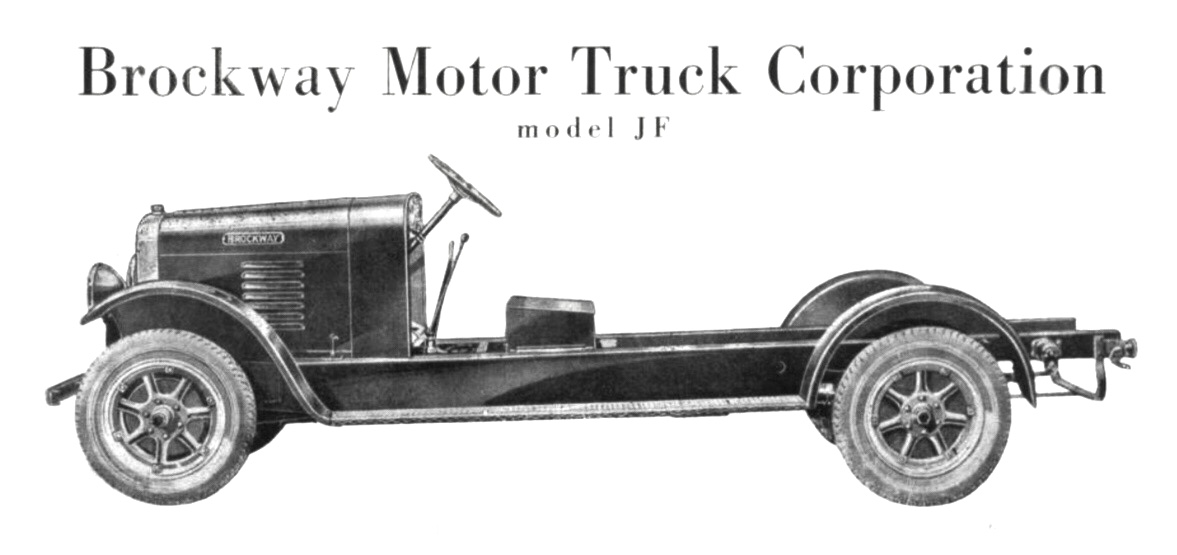
Brockway model JF

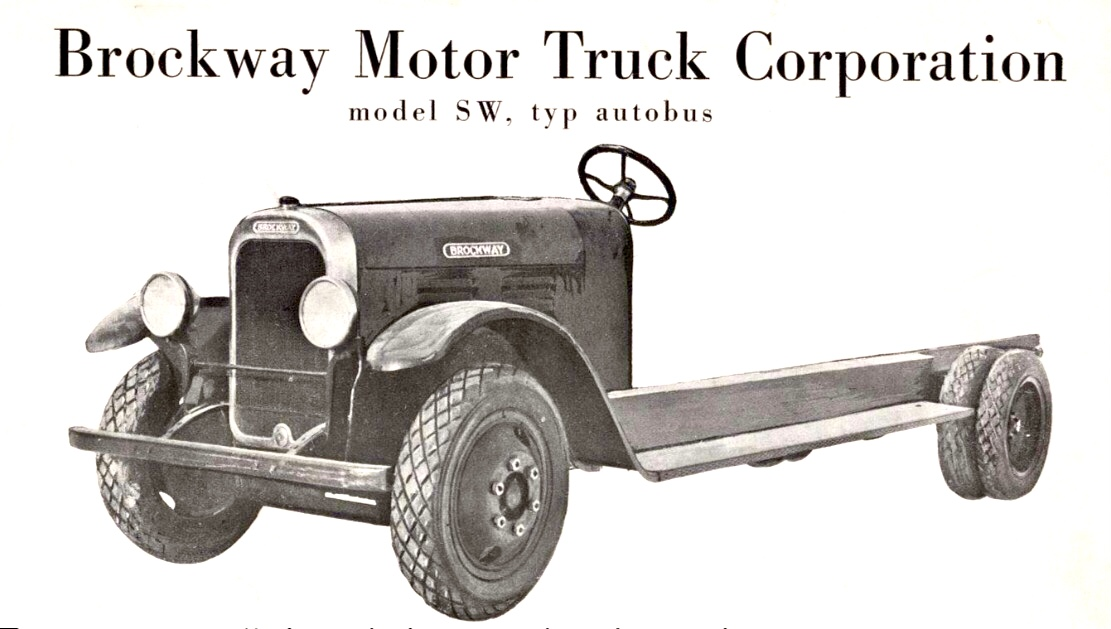
Brockway model SW bus

Brockway Motor Company was a builder of custom heavy-duty trucks in Cortland, New York, from 1912 to 1977.

== History ==
The company was founded as Brockway Carriage Works in 1875 by William Brockway. His son George Brockway later turned the carriages into a truck manufacturer in 1909. The first trucks were high-wheelers. During World War I, Brockway built 587 Class B Liberty Trucks for the military. After the war they produced a new range from 1-ton to 5-tons.

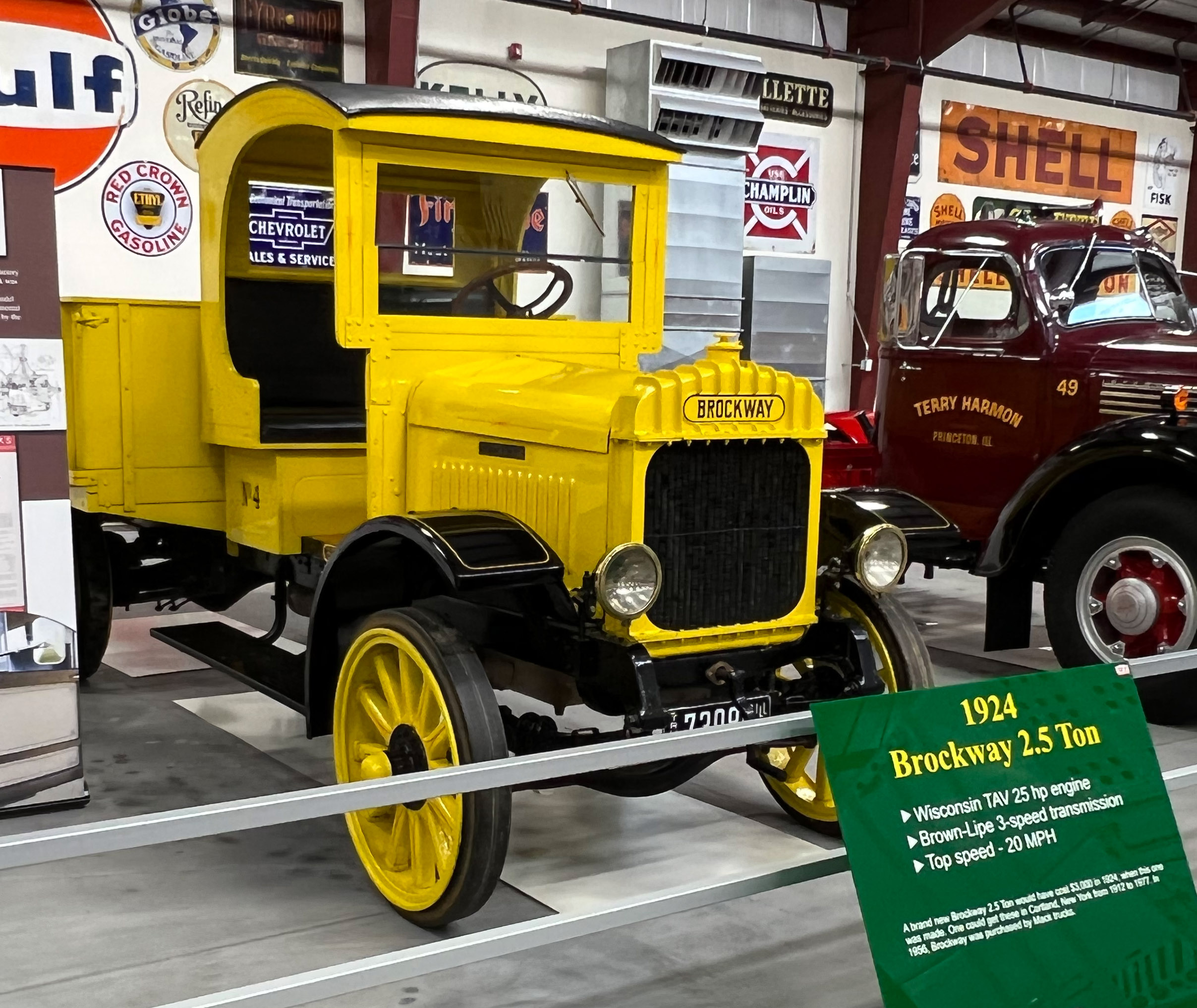
1924 Brockway 2.5-ton truck on display at the Iowa 80 Trucking Museum, Walcott, Iowa.

They began with Continental engines but switched to Wisconsin units in 1925. They bought the Indiana Truck Corporation in 1928 but were forced to sell it to White Motor Company in the early years of the Great Depression. A new range, the V1200 was offered from 1934 to 1937. The V1200 used a 240 hp (179 kW) V-12 American LaFrance engine and carried loads up to 15 tons. In 1935, Brockway sold 1245 units and in 1936 it increased to 1695 trucks. In 1938, Brockway sold 1303 units and in 1939 it increased to 1815 trucks.

During World War II, Brockway manufactured the B666 heavy truck, including the B666 Daybrook M-II-A bridge erector and C666 Quick Way crane, as well as G547 and G690 6-ton 6×6 bridging trucks, part of a standard design series also built by Corbitt and White. G547 "Treadway" trucks had a large hoist on the rear for self-unloading, while the G690 chassis were fitted with "Quickway" cranes, also used in bridging operations.

All 6-ton military trucks (of all manufacturers) had Hercules HXD 855 cu in (14 L) inline-six cylinder gasoline engines, developing 202 hp (151 kW) at 2150 rpm and 642 lbf⋅ft (870 N⋅m) of torque at 900 rpm.

Post-World War II Brockway produced single and dual axle tractors and heavy duty triaxle dump trucks. The company was purchased by Mack Trucks Inc. in August 1956 and remained a division of Mack until its closing in June 1977. Mack cited "union troubles" for the closure.

== Engines ==
Brockway commercial trucks primarily used Cummins engines, though many were powered by Detroit Diesels. Some Brockway trucks were equipped with gasoline Hercules inline-six engines fitted with Rochester 2G (DualJet) carburetors.

== Legacy ==
In the making of the 1978 film Convoy, the loaded trailer of a white 1972 Brockway 361 tractor toppled when the convoy made a sharp turn at an intersection, also toppling the tractor. The unplanned scene was then included in the movie. The Brockway laying on its side due to adverse circumstances, being kicked in frustration by driver "Widow Woman", and then abandoned in a hurry while the movie hero "Rubber Duck" carried on in his Mack RS700, inadvertently illustrated the recent demise of the Brockway line.

There is a Brockway Truck show in Cortland each year with many events occurring at the official Brockway Museum located in Homer, NY at the Central New York Living History Center.

The hood ornament used by Brockway was a husky dog with pulling harness, thus giving Cortland the nickname of "Huskie Town USA".

A documentary about the trucks and the Brockway company is available from Wiffle Ball Productions in Cortland, New York.

Year	Production figures	Model	Load capacity	Serial number
1909			to	
1910			to	
1911			to	
1912		A	to	
1913		A	to	
1914		G	to	
1915			to	
1916			to	
1917			to	
1918			to	
1919			to	
1920			to	
1921			to	
1922		E	0,75-1 to	
		S5	1,5 to	
		K5	2,5 to	
		R4	3,5 to	
		T4	5 to	
Sum				
1923		E	1 to	
		S	1,5 to	
		K	2,5 to	
		R	3,5 to	
		T	5 to	
Sum				
1924		E	1,25 to	
		E7	1,25 to	
		E8	1,25 to	
		S	2 to	
		SK	2 to	
		K	3 to	
		KR	3 to	
		R	4 to	
		RT	4 to	
		T	5 to	
		⟨EB⟩	16 Ps	
		⟨H⟩	21 Ps	
		⟨J⟩	25 Ps	
		⟨I⟩	30 Ps	
Sum				

vehicles in angle bracket = ⟨bus⟩
