= Indiana Truck Corporation =

Defunct American motor vehicle manufacturer

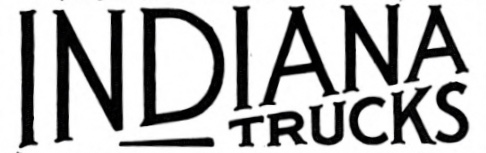
- Type: Truck Company
- Industry: Manufacturing
- Founded: 1898; 128 years ago
- Defunct: 1939; 87 years ago
- Headquarters: Cleveland, US
- Products: Trucks

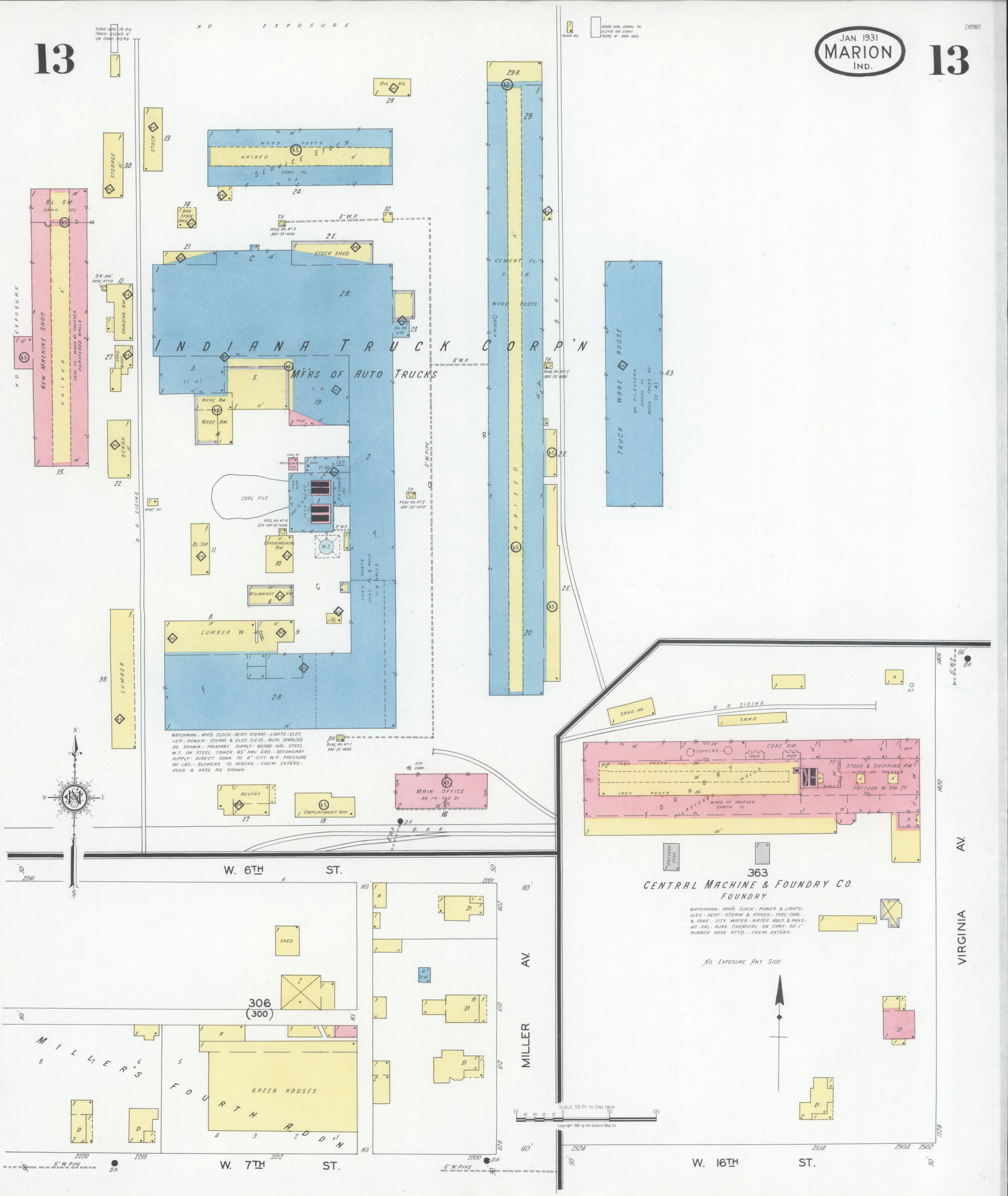
Indiana Truck plant (1931)

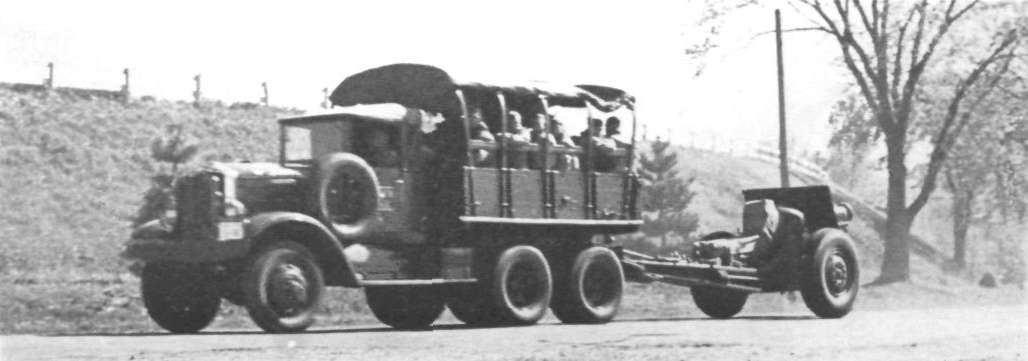
Indiana Truck (1940)

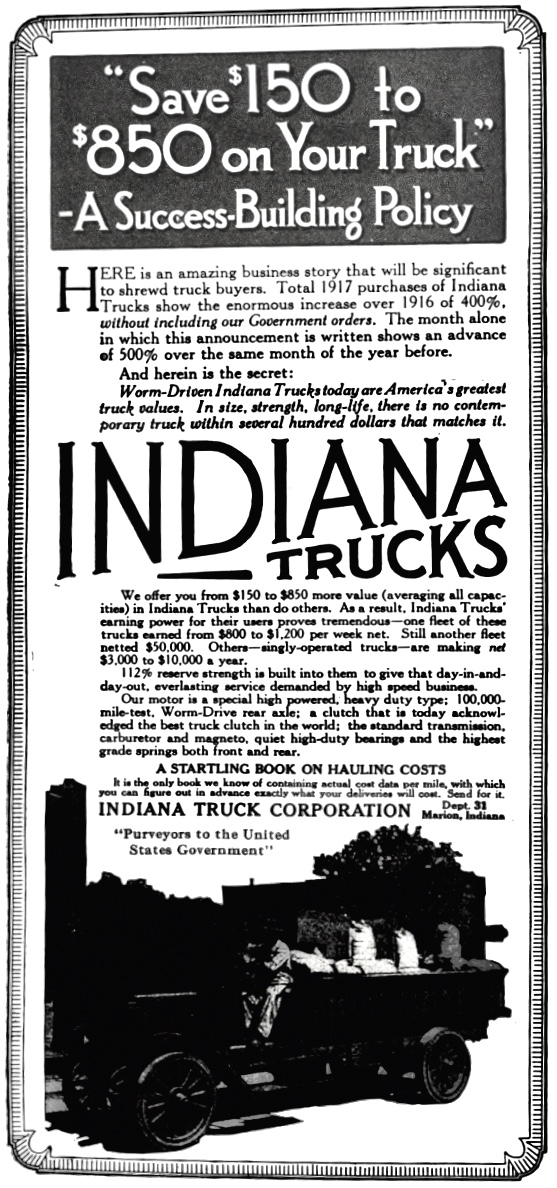
Indiana advertisement (1918)

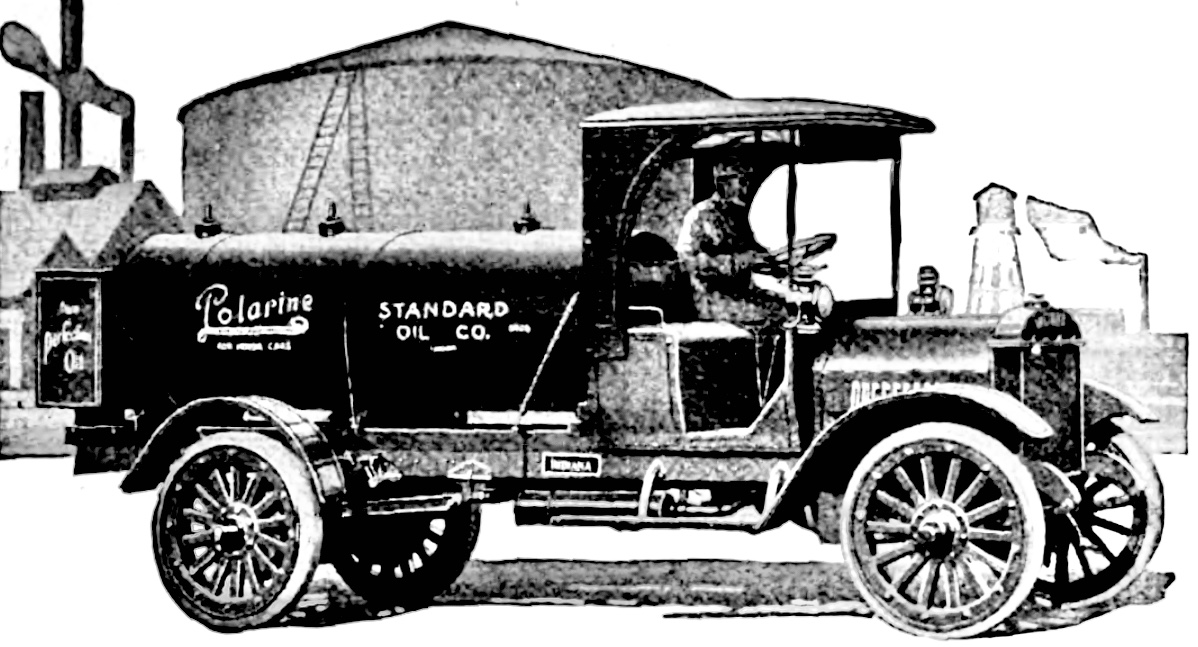
Indiana Truck (1918)

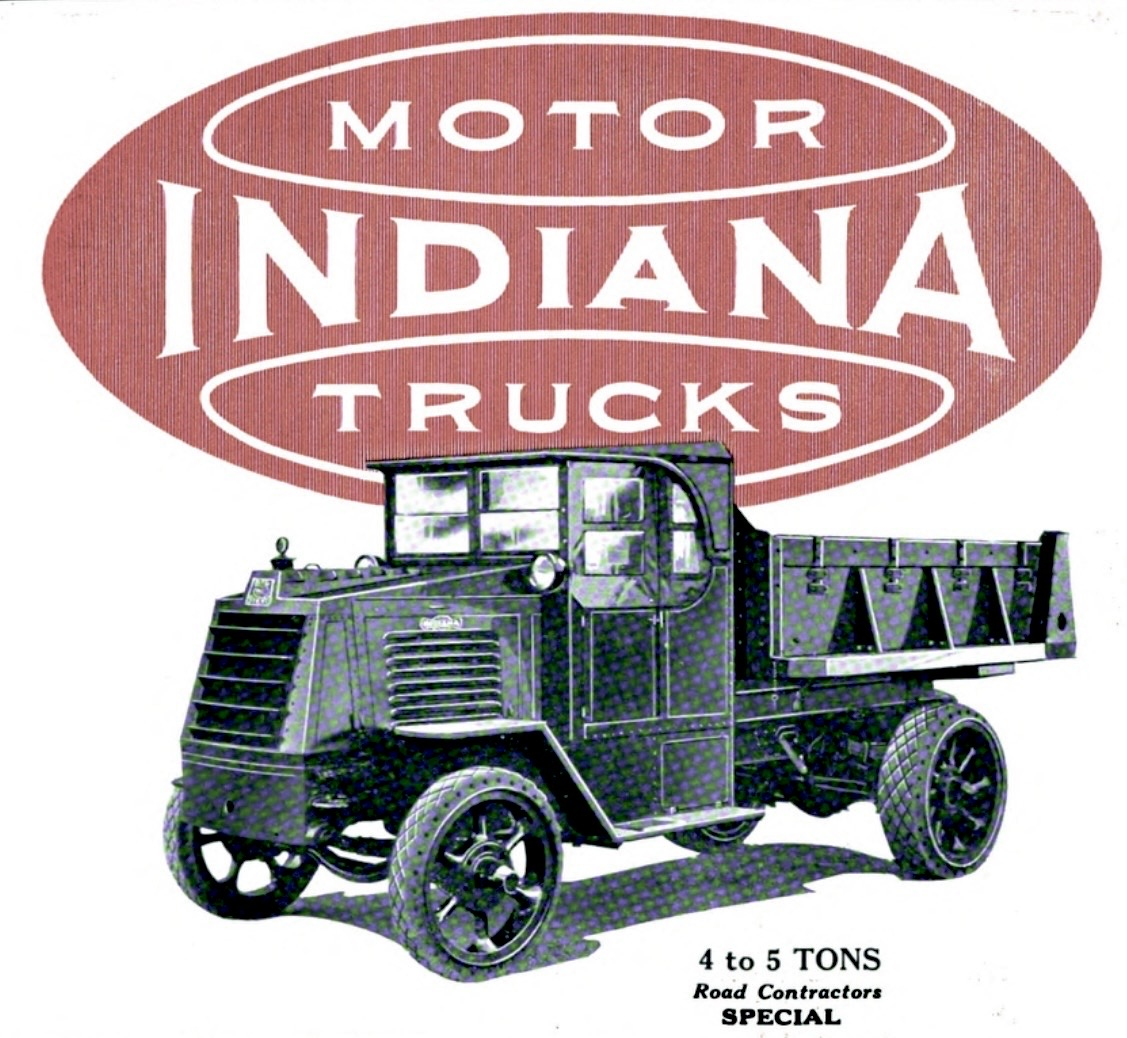
Indiana 4-5 to Road Contractor Special (1925-1927)

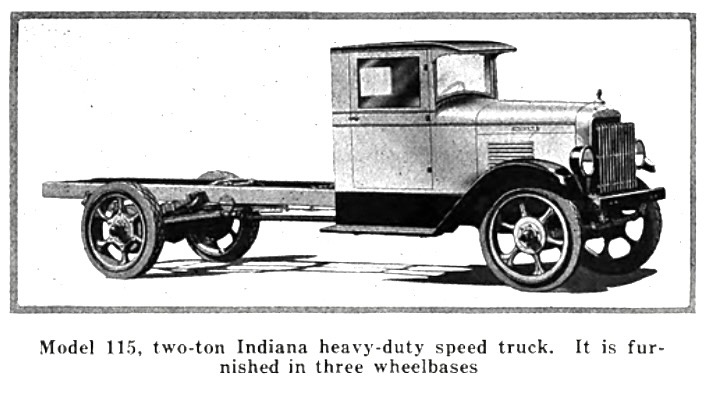
Indiana Model 115 (1927-1928)

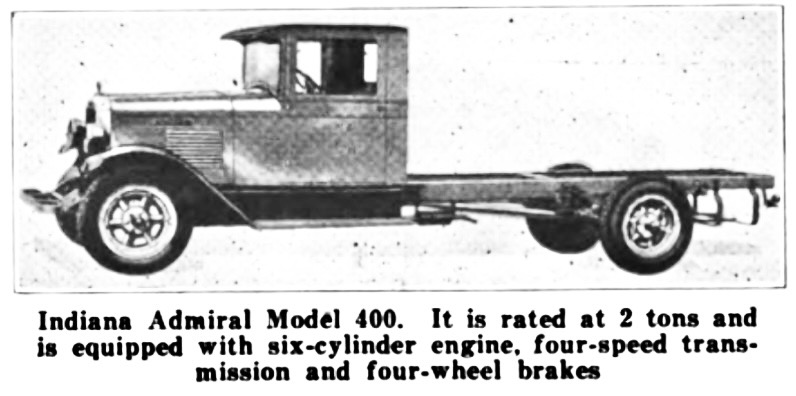
Indiana Admiral Model 400 (1928)

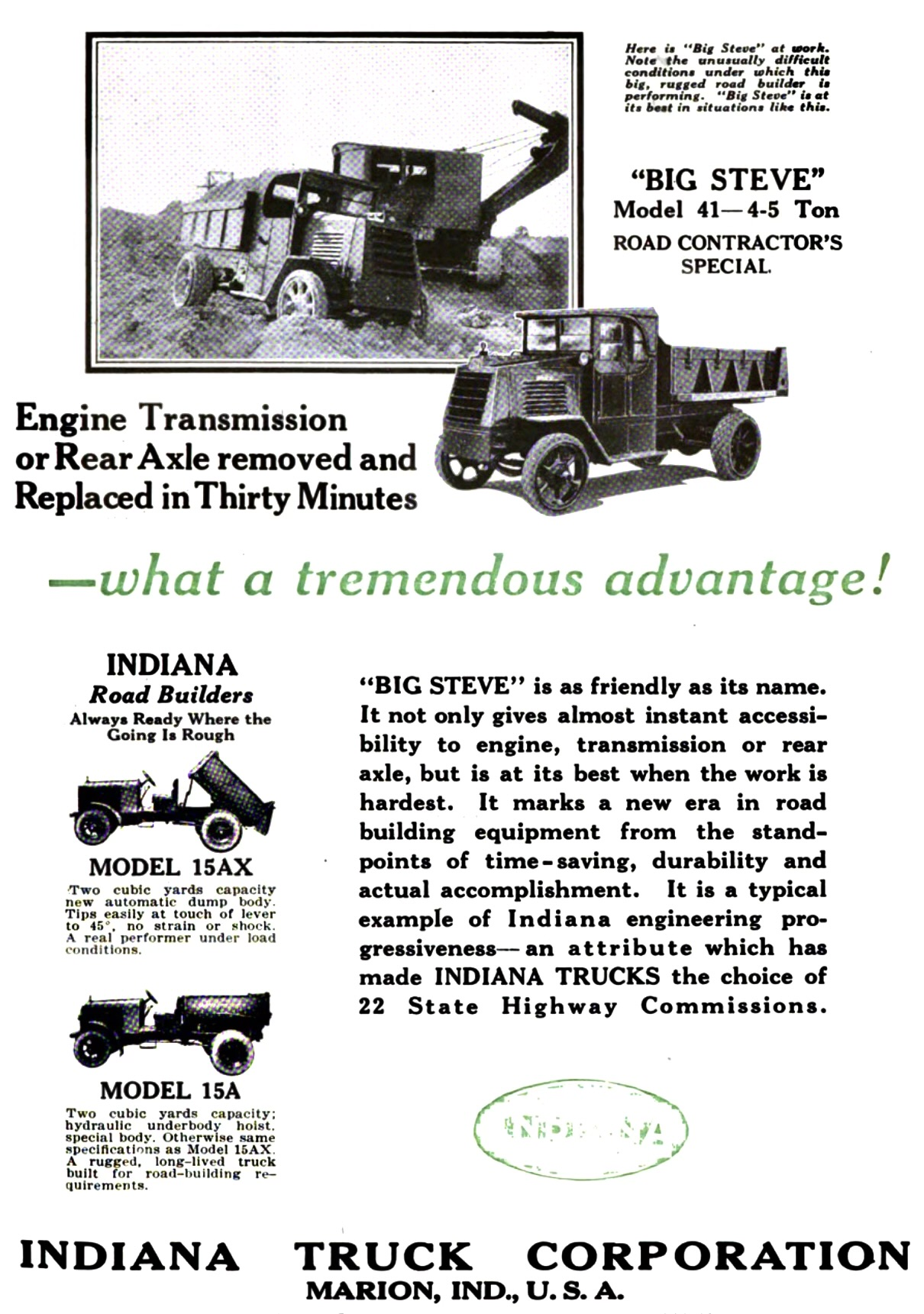
Indiana advertisement (1926)

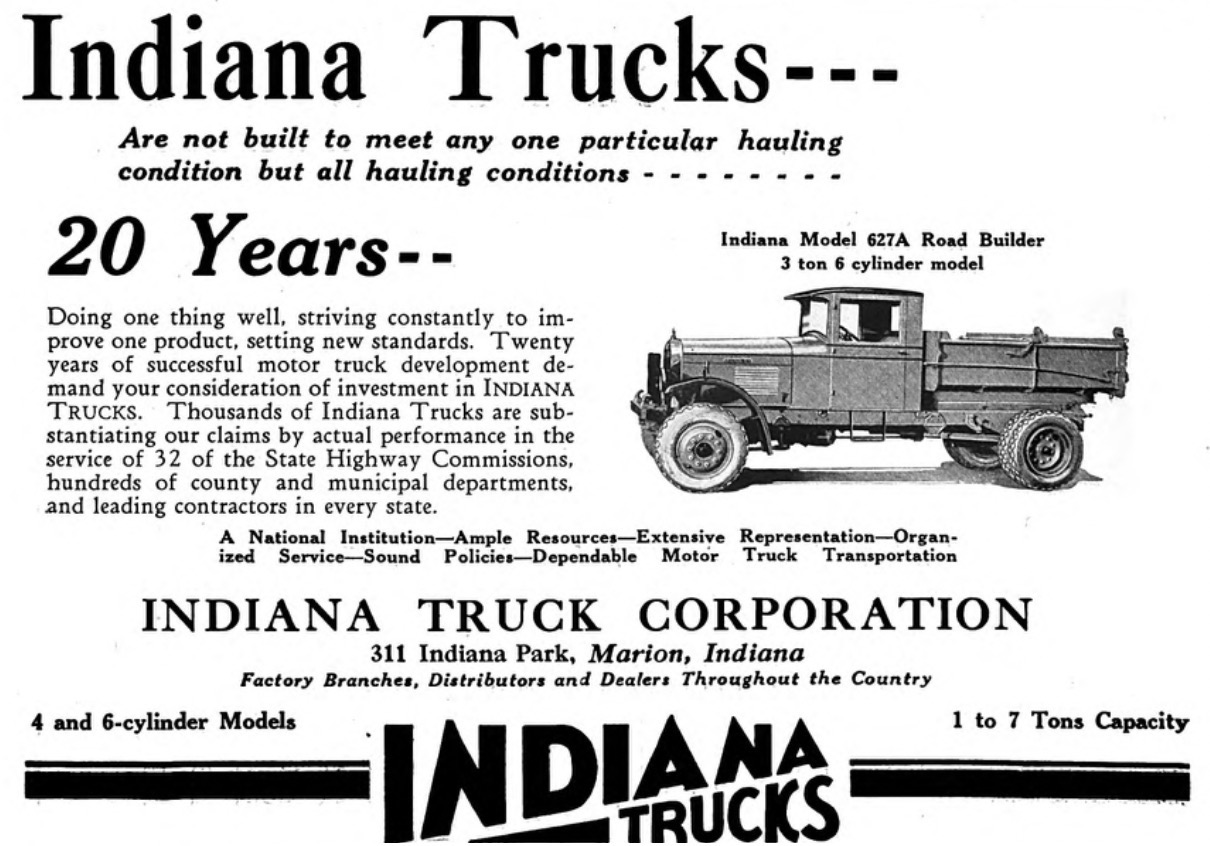
Indiana Model 627 (1929)

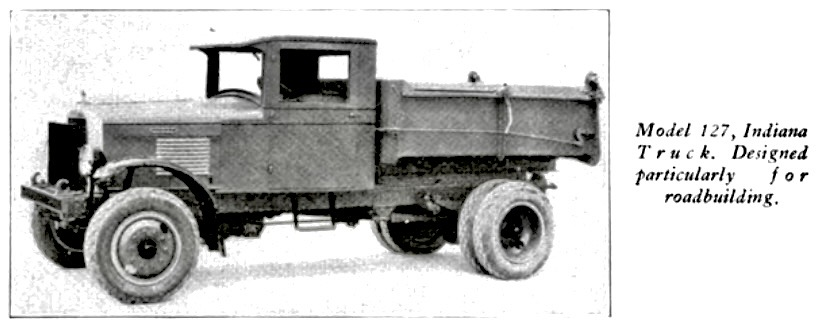
Indiana Model 127 (1929)

The Indiana Truck Corporation of Cleveland, was a truck manufacturer.

== History ==
Originally, the company was a manufacturer of mattresses and bed springs from 1898. This production continued throughout all the years until the end. The company produced its first truck in Marion, Indiana in 1910. The first Indiana 'Truck No. 1001' was manufactured with a four-cylinder Rutenber gasoline engine with a displacement of 3300 cc, solid rubber tires, and the rear axle was driven by chains. In 1917, four times as many trucks were sold compared to 1916. In 1927, the company was sold to Brockway Motor Company. In 1936, 1,706 vehicles were sold. After that, the numbers steadily declined. Indiana trucks were assembled until 1939.

== Products ==
In 1914:

- Model B (1 t)
- Model F (2 t)
- Model K (3 t)

In 1916:

- Model R
- Model F
- Model D

In 1929

- Model 11
- Model 611
- Model 111
- Model 6111
- Model 400 (Admiral)
- Model 111A
- Model 111X
- Model 115A
- Model 615A
- Model 126
- Model 626
- Model 127
- Model 627
- Model 628
- Model 136
- Model 636
- Model 638
- Model 138
- Model 41
- Model 641
