= Corbitt (automobile company) =

Defunct American motor vehicle manufacturer

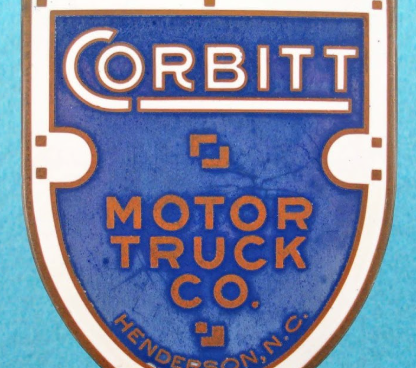
- Founded: 1899
- Defunct: 1954
- Products: Automobiles, trucks, and farm equipment

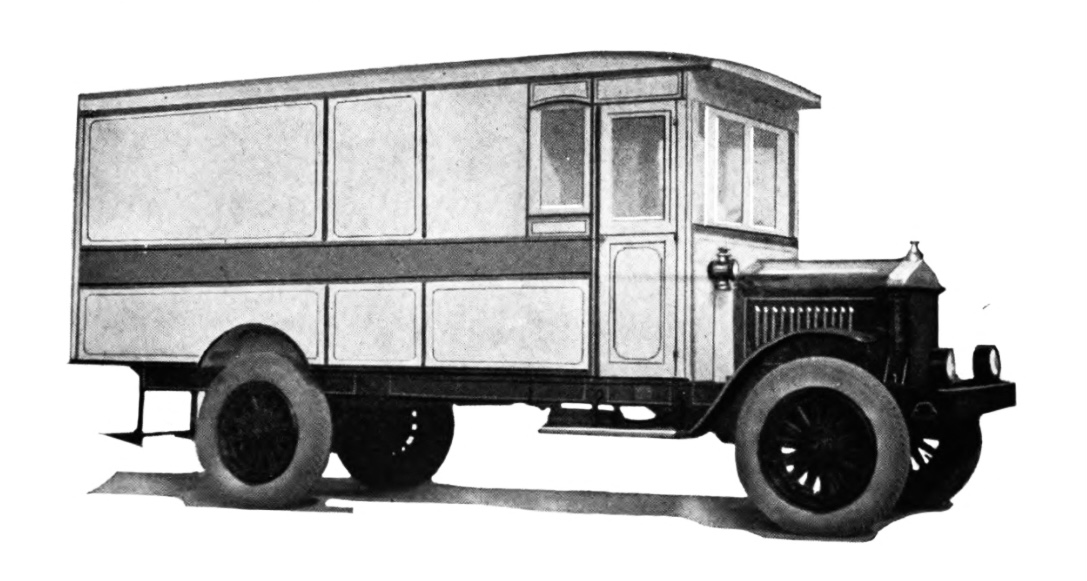
Corbitt 25 (1926)

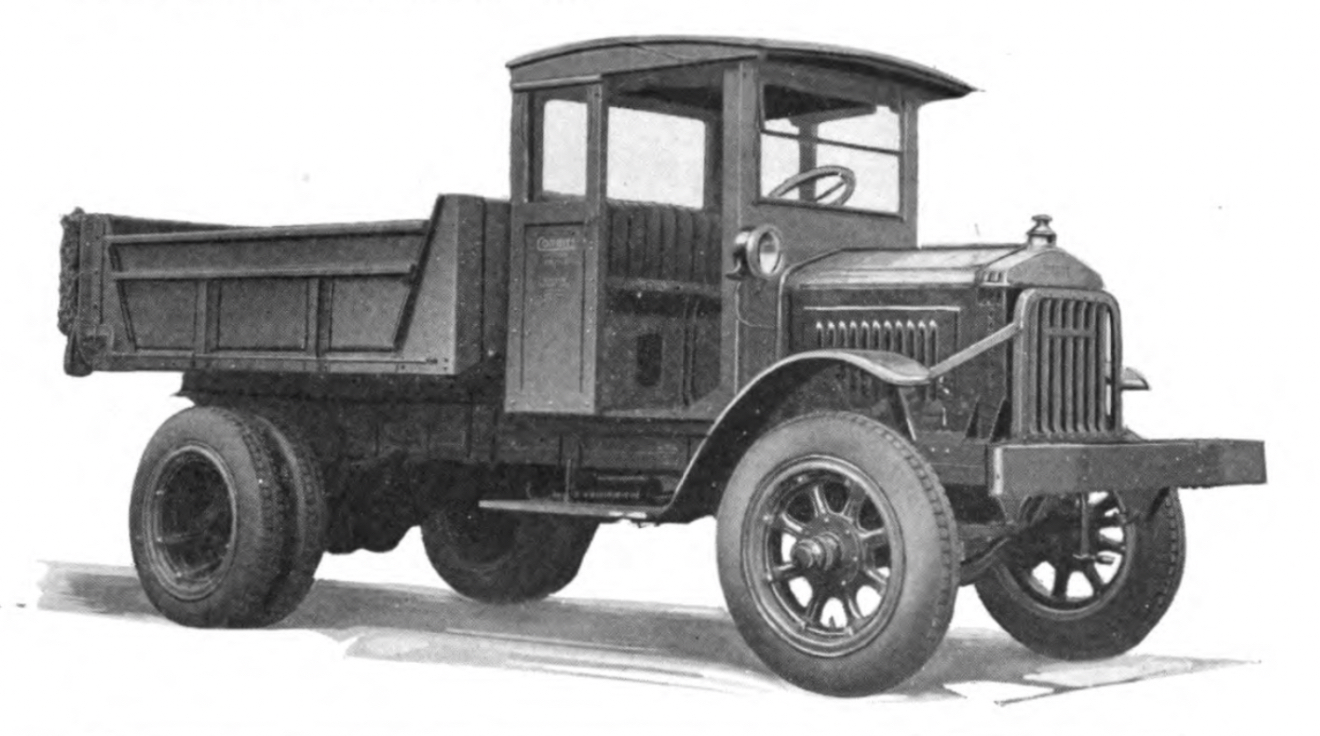
Corbitt 40 (1927)

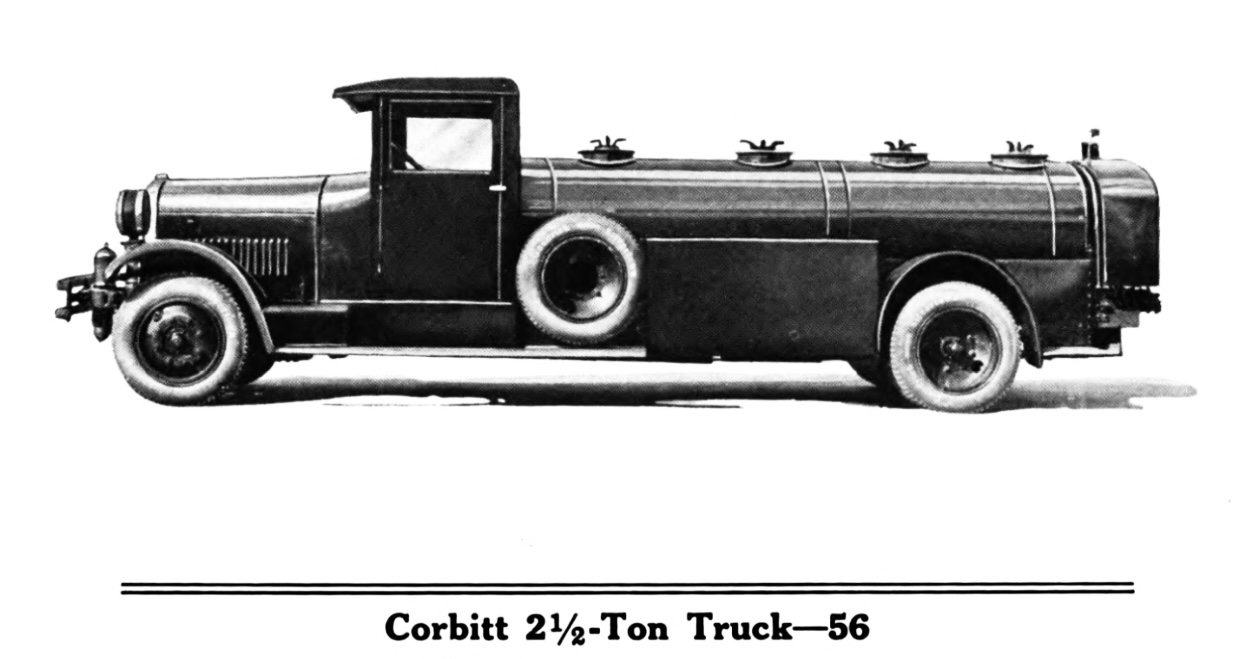
Corbitt 56 (1928-1929)

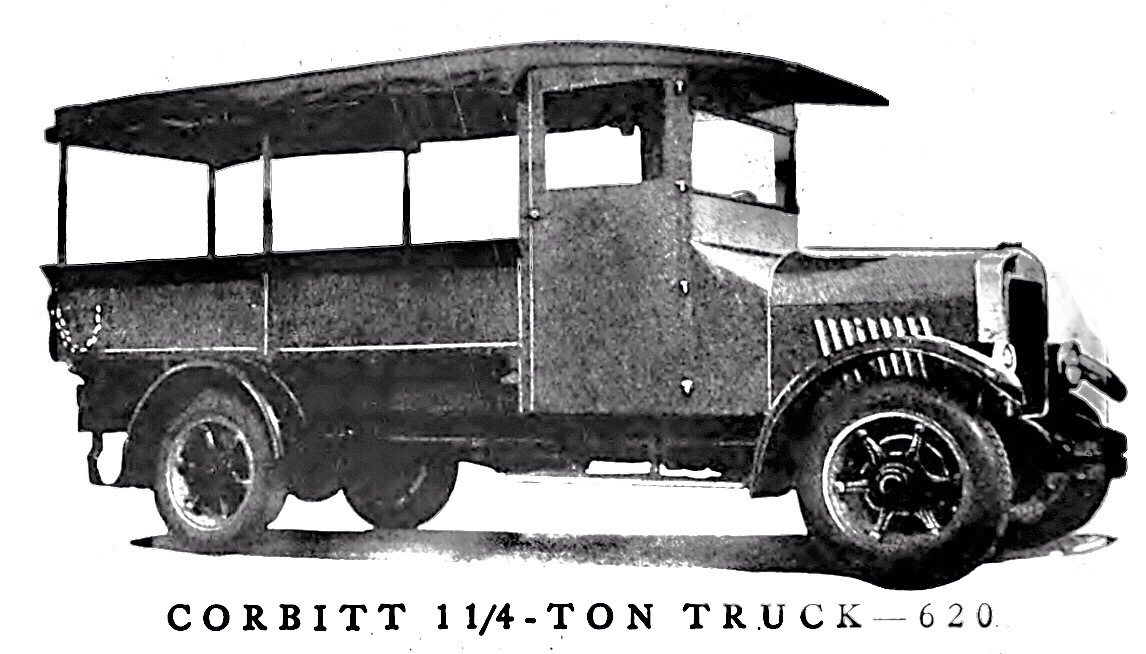
Corbitt 620 (1929)

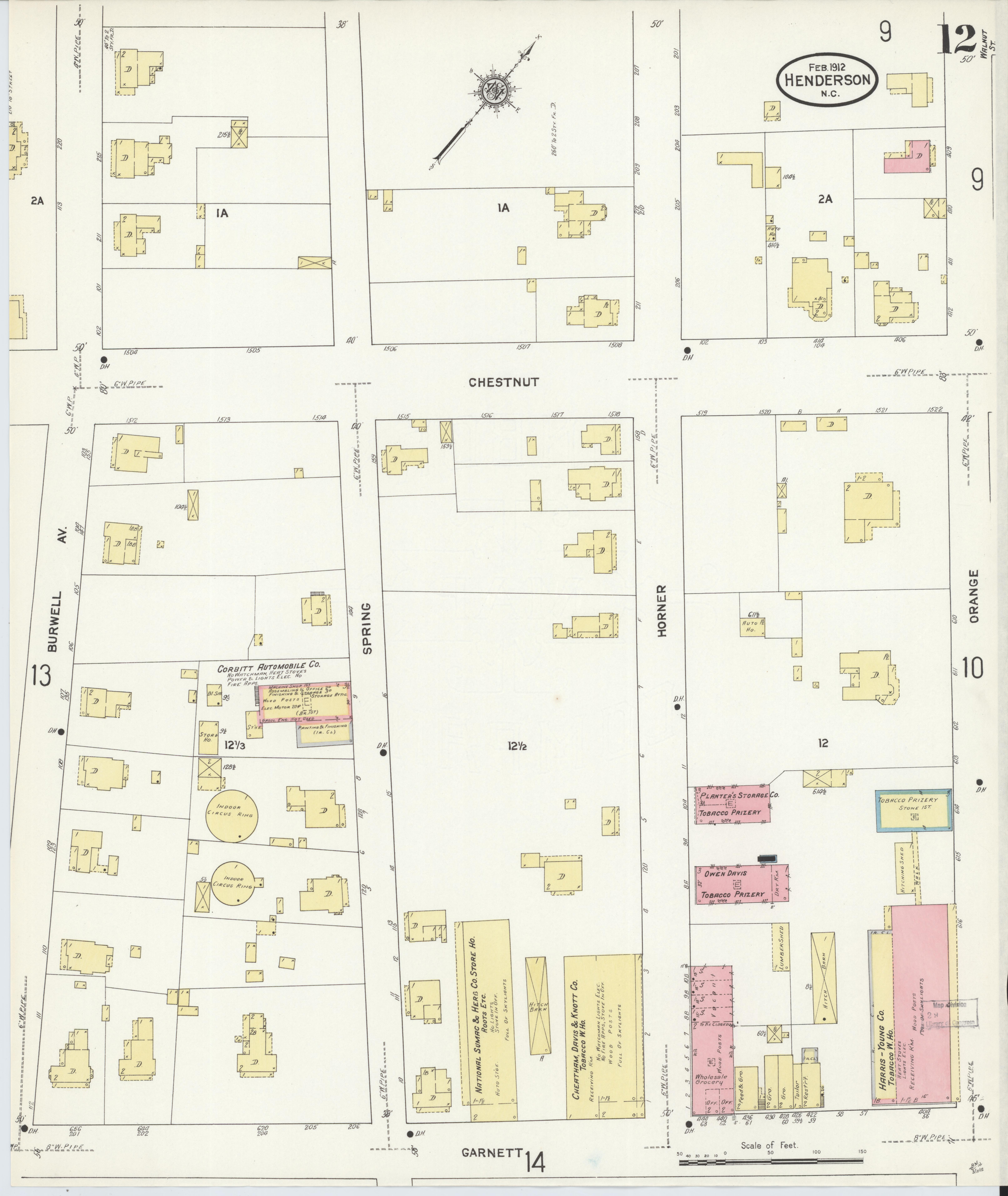
Corbitt Plant (1912)

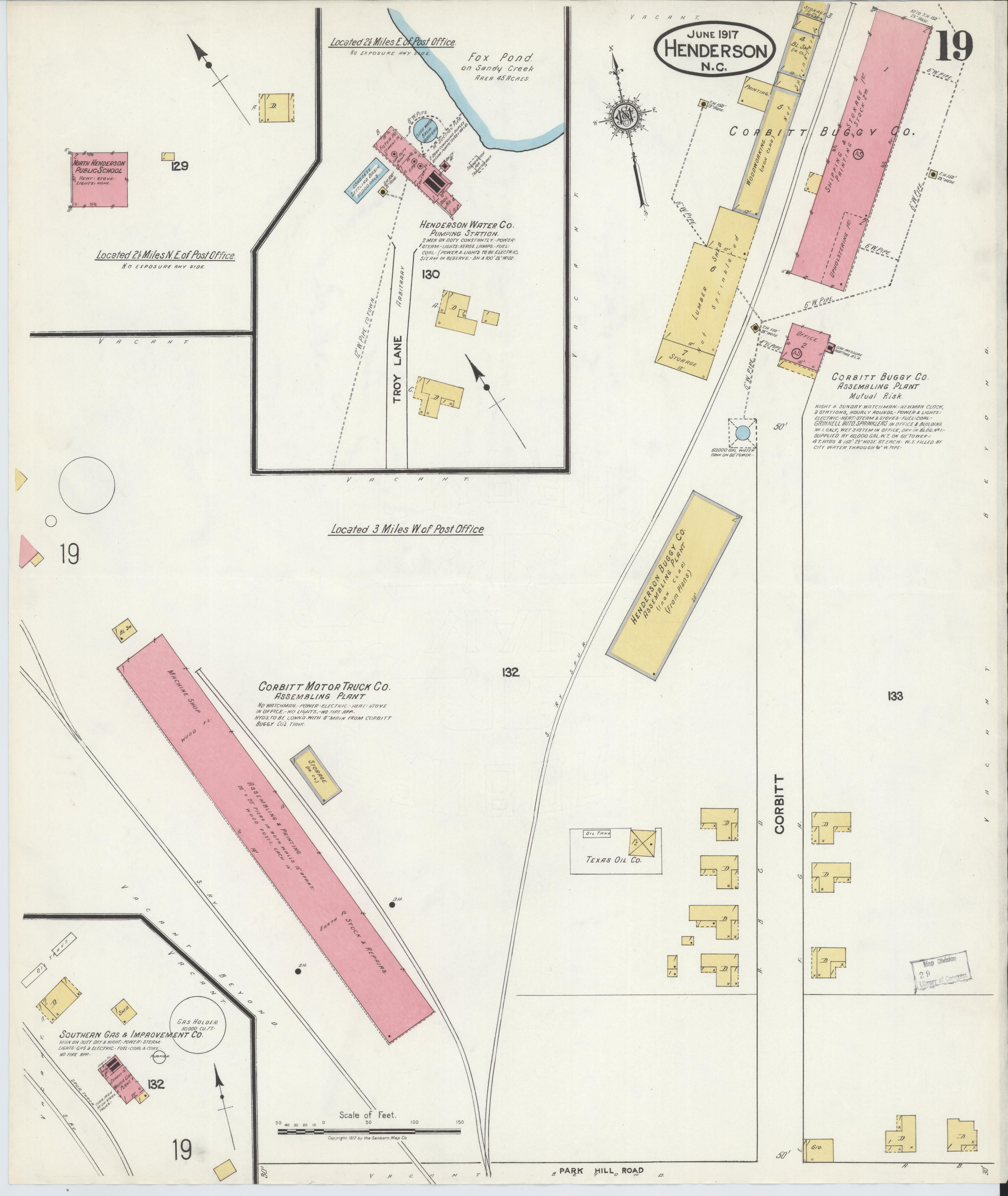
Corbitt Assembling Plant (1917)

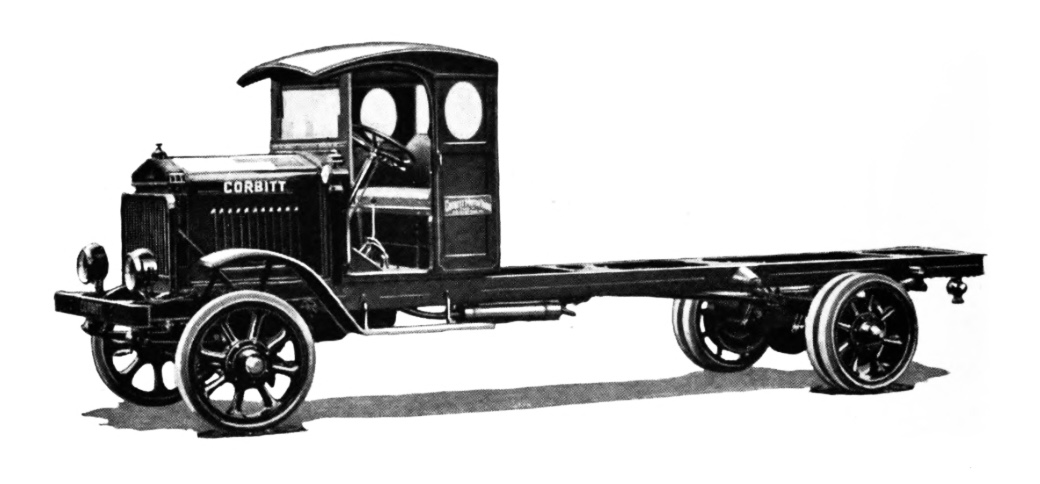
Corbitt Model A

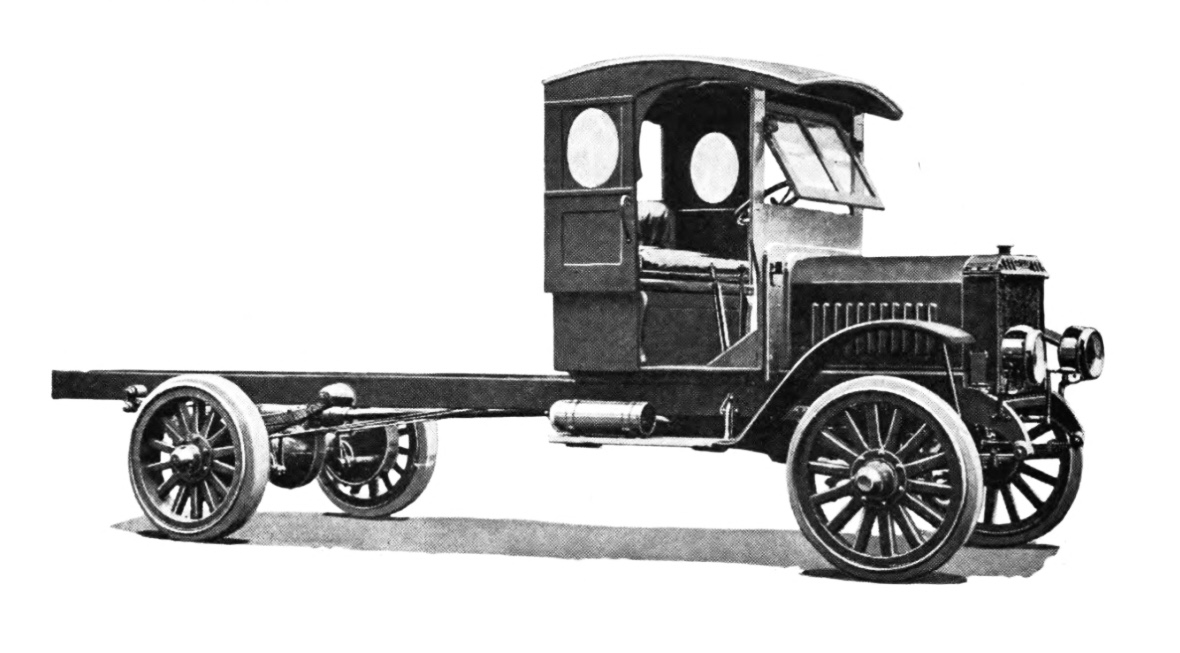
Corbitt Model B

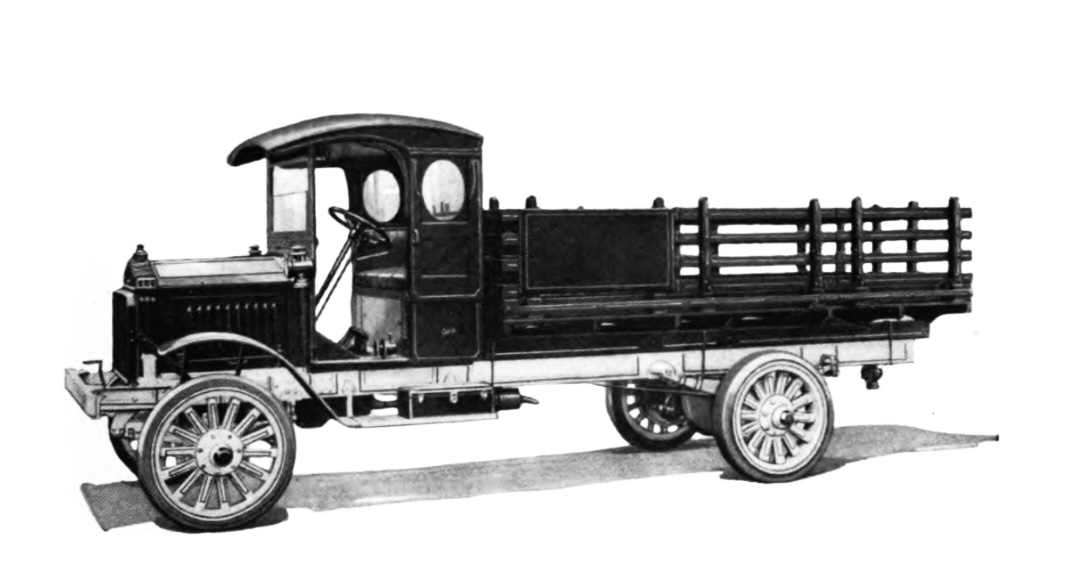
Corbitt Model C

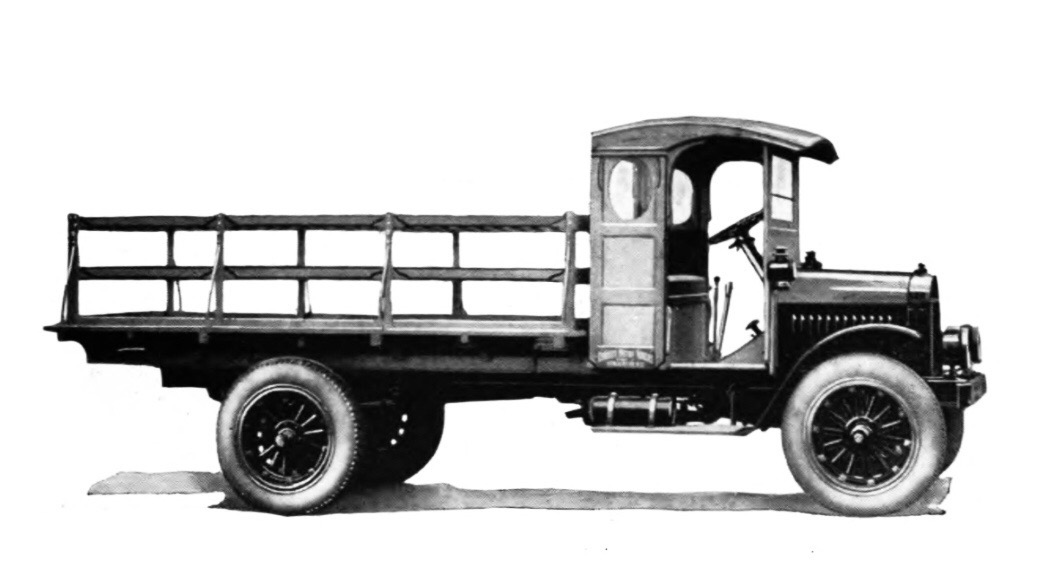
Corbitt Model E

Corbitt was an American automobile, truck, and farm equipment manufacturer. Richard J Corbitt founded a tobacco business in North Carolina in 1894. As a small tobacco dealer, he felt hopeless against the large tobacco industry and decided around 1899 to enter the manufacturing of horse-drawn carriage buggies. He succeeded in taking over the three competing local buggy builders. In 1905, Corbitt built his first automobile, which he called 'Motorbuggy', and which went into mass production in 1907. Financially, the first motor buggies were a failure. Starting in 1910, with the production of a 1.5-ton truck with chain drive, profits were made and the business expanded over the years to include light and heavy trucks, intracity buses, personnel vehicles for the U.S. Army, and farm tractors. Based in Henderson, North Carolina, for its entire history, it sold in 1952 to the United Industrial Syndicate, a New York City-based company which gradually liquidated Corbitt and shut it down. The last production vehicles came off the line in 1954, though a few vehicles were cobbled together from leftover parts in the years after that.

- Corbitt Military vehicles
  - 6-ton 6×6 truck
  - 8-ton 6x4

Year	Model	Production	Load Capacity	Serial numbers	Displacement
1913	D		2 seater Roadster		3707cc
	E		4 seater Tourer		3707 cc
	F		5 seater Tourer		3707 cc
1914	D		2 seater Roadster		3707 cc
	E		4 seater Tourer		3707 cc
	F		5 seater Tourer		3707 cc
1918	AA	9	5 t	1000-1008	6969 cc
	A	22	3,5 t	2000-2021	5734 cc
	B	40	2,5 t	3000-3039	4599 cc
	C	104	2 t	4000-4103	4599 cc
	D	35	1,5 t	5000-5034	3620 cc
	E	82	1 t	6000-6081	3620 cc
Sum	292				
1919	AA	?	5 t	1009-	6969 cc
	A	37	3,5 t	2022-2058	5734 cc
	B	62	2,5 t	3040-3101	4599 cc
	C	80	2 t	4104-4183	4599 cc
	D	36	1,5 t	5035-5070	3620 cc
	E	43	1 t	6082-6124	3620 cc
Sum	> 258				
1920	AA	2	5 t	101001-101003	6969 cc
	A	21	3,5 t	701059-701080	5734 cc
	B	125	2,5 t	501002-501127	4599 cc
	C	76	2 t	401184-401260	4599 cc
	D	81	1,5 t	301071-301152	3620 cc
	E	48	1 t	201125-207173	3620 cc
Sum	353				
1921	AA	2	5 t	101003-101004	6969 cc
	A	12	3,5 t	701080-701091	5734 cc
	B	47	2,5 t	501127-501173	4599 cc
	C	3	2 t	401260-401262	4599 cc
	D	29	1,5 t	301152-303180	3620 cc
	E	28	1 t	207173-211200	3620 cc
	H	4	0,75 t	801001-801004	3620 cc
Sum	125				
1922	H	26	0,75 t	801005-801030	3620 cc
1926	20	35	1 t	206001-207035	2639 cc
	25	89	1,5 t	256141-257230	4184 cc
	40	28	2 t	406003-407030	4184 cc
	B	15	2,5 t	560265-570279	4599 cc
	R	6	3 t	660048-670053	5734 cc
	A	11	4 t	760118-770128	5734 cc
	70	5	5 t	161038-171042	8044 cc

It is not known whether all the recorded serial numbers were used. Note: The First figure of the Serial Number denotes the capacity in thousand pounds. The second and third Number are a key to the Units that go into the Truck. The last three Figures are the serial number!
