= Shad (disambiguation) =

A shad is a herring-like fish of the subfamily Alosinae, particularly of the genus Alosa.

Shad may also refer to:

== People ==
- Shad (rapper), born Shadrach Kabango, Canadian hip hop musician
- Shaad Ali, Indian film director and screenwriter
- Shad Banks Jr. (born 2003), American football player
- Shad Barry, American baseball player
- Shad Darsigny (born 2003), Canadian weightlifter
- Shad Gaspard, (1981–2020) American wrestler
- Shad Saleem Faruqi, Malaysian law professor
- Shad Meier, American football player
- Shad Gregory Moss, better known as Bow Wow (rapper)
- Shad Pearce, Arkansas State Representative
- Shad Petosky, American comics writer
- Shad Qadri, Canadian politician
- Shaad Randhawa, Indian film actor
- Shad Royston, Australian rugby player
- John S.R. Shad, American politician and diplomat
- Shad Thyrion (died 2022), American murder victim
- Shad Tubman, or William V. S. Tubman Jr. in full, Liberian politician

== Places ==
- Shad, Iran, a village in Razavi Khorasan Province, Iran
- Shad Bagh, Punjab, Pakistan
- Shad Cam, extreme southern portion of Mount Wellington in New York.
- Shad Bay, Nova Scotia
- Shad, West Virginia
- Shad Thames, a London street

== Organizations and events ==
- Shad Alliance, American anti-nuclear group
- Shad Planking, an annual Virginian political event
- Canadian Forces Naval Reserve, the reserve component of the Canadian Forces Maritime Command whose members are commonly referred to as "Shads"
- SHAD (summer program) (formerly Shad Valley), Canadian non-for-profit organization and summer enrichment program for high school students

== Transportation ==
- Shad boat, a type of boat
- Shad-Wyck, American automobile
- USS Shad, the name of more than one United States Navy ship
- Kingston-class coastal defence vessel, a class of commissioned vessels of the Canadian Navy crewed by reservists, commonly referred to as "Shadillacs"

== Other ==
- ShAD, Ground Attack Aviation Division of the Soviet Air Forces
- Shad (prince), Turkic title
- Amelanchier, also known as shadbush, shadblow, and shadwood
- Mayfly, also known as a shadfly
- Project SHAD, American military project
- Danda, a punctuation mark known as "shad" when writing Tibetan or ʼPhags-pa
  - Rgya Gram Shad, the Tibetan character "༒"
- The Shad Treatment, 1977 novel by Garrett Epps
