= List of killings by law enforcement officers in the United States, November 2026 =

This is a list of people reported killed by non-military law enforcement officers in the United States in November 2026, whether in the line of duty or not, and regardless of reason or method. The listing documents the occurrence of a death, making no implications regarding wrongdoing or justification on the part of the person killed or officer involved. Killings are arranged by date of the incident that caused death. Different death dates, if known, are noted in the description. The table below lists 67 people.

== November 2026 ==
Date	Name (age) of deceased	Race	Location	Description
2026-11-20	unidentified male	Unknown	Lawrence, Indiana	Police responded to a domestic violence report and shot a man after he allegedly refused to drop a firearm.
2026-11-20	Justin Burrows (38)	Unknown	Lexington, Kentucky	Police responded to a reported robbery and shot Burrows, who was allegedly armed with a blade.
2026-11-19	John Ireland (40)	Unknown	Pompano Beach, Florida	Broward deputies responded to a call about Ireland threatening to kill people while armed with a metal object. Ireland was hit by a deputy's bean bag round in an attempt to subdue Ireland but to no avail. Ireland then charged at deputies while armed before being fatally shot.
2026-11-19	Demarco Peck (18)	Unknown	Lake Tansi, Tennessee	Police responded to reports that Peck was attempting to assault people with a box cutter. Peck and an officer got into a physical altercation before an officer shot and killed him.
2026-11-18	Nico Anthony Sacchetti (37)	White	Hibbing, Minnesota	Chisholm Police were investigating a hit-and-run in Mountain Iron when they received a report of an altercation involving the same driver at a gas station. When police spoke to Sacchetti, he allegedly shoved an officer and pulled out a long gun, leading officers to shoot him. Sacchetti was a former player for the Minnesota Golden Gophers ice hockey team.
2026-11-18	unidentified male	Unknown	Little Rock, Arkansas	Police shot and killed a barricaded suspect. Few details were immediately released.
2026-11-18	Edward Santiago (36)	Hispanic	Clearwater, Florida	A woman called police to report a domestic incident at an apartment. Santiago, who was also wanted for rape, was located at a hotel, where police pursued him. He went behind a power box, and an officer shot him after he allegedly reached for a gun.
2026-11-16	Joseph Patrick Dixon (32)	White	Nashville, Tennessee	Metro Nashville officers and detectives arrived at Village South Apartments in the Melrose neighborhood to serve a warrant for Dixon, who was wanted on aggravated assault and vandalism charges. As the officers knocked on the door, Dixon jumped from the window of his second-story apartment to the ground below. During the foot chase, Dixon approached officers with an extended gun before officers fatally shot him dead. The footage had been released.
2026-11-16	Gabino Ernesto Hernandez (40)	Unknown	San Antonio, Texas	A woman called police to report Hernandez, her brother, told her that he had just killed his wife. After a two-hour standoff at his home, police shot Hernandez when he approached the front door with a gun. Hernandez's wife was found dead in the home. Hernandez also had a pending sexual assault case.
2026-11-16	unidentified male	Unknown	Donie, Texas	Freestone County deputies fatally shot an armed man following a disturbance call.
2026-11-15	unidentified male (62)	Unknown	Dinwiddie, Virginia	Dinwiddie County Sheriff’s Office responded to a home for a disturbance call. The first deputy arrived was involved in a struggle with a man before the deputy shot him.
2026-11-15	unidentified male	Unknown	Monroe, Georgia	Walton County deputies received a report of a temporary protective order violation at a home in Monroe. Deputies came across an armed man before they shot him dead for unknown reasons.
2026-11-15	Clifton Charles Matthews	Unknown	College Station, Texas	A woman called police to report Matthews was preventing her from leaving her apartment building and was possibly experiencing a mental health crisis. Officers shot and killed Matthews after he allegedly charged at them with a knife.
2026-11-15	unidentified female	Unknown	Suitland-Silver Hill, Maryland	A United States Park Police officer pursued a stolen vehicle from Washington, D.C., into Prince George's County. After police stopped the vehicle, two suspects fled, and the officer shot one of them.
2026-11-15	Sean Lewis Clements (58)	White	Johnston, Iowa	An officer shot Clements, from Des Moines, while attempting to arrest him for failing to register as a sex offender. Clements pulled out a fake gun during the encounter.
2026-11-14	Dannie Darlene Rodriguez (35)	Unknown	Kissimmee, Florida	Osceola County deputies responded to an altercation at a downtown restaurant and bar in Kissimmee. Prior to arrival, the woman, Rodriguez, pulled out a handgun and followed a man toward the exit while pointing the handgun to his back. As officers arrived, Rodriguez continued following the man outside while holding the gun at her side. Rodriguez refused to comply as officers demanded her to drop the weapon. When the man turned to face Rodriguez, she raised the gun and pointed it directly at his head. One deputy fatally shot Rodriguez as deputies feared that the man or nearby patrons could be harmed. Rodriguez's husband was tased and arrested after an altercation with deputies when Rodriguez was fatally shot. The footage leading up to the shooting had been released by the sheriff's office.
2026-11-14	unidentified	Unknown	Anniston, Alabama	A Calhoun County deputy was on patrol when a driver ran a red light and the deputy's cruiser struck the vehicle on Alabama State Route 21 near the Anniston-Saks border. The officer was uninjured, while the driver was killed.
2026-11-14	unidentified male	Unknown	Lindstrom, Minnesota	A woman called police to report that a man had shot her and another man at a home. A Chisago County deputy responded and shot the gunman. The male shooting victim was also pronounced dead.
2026-11-14	Telvin Pierre Portee (34)	Unknown	Seven Oaks, South Carolina	Portee shot an off-duty Lexington County sheriff's deputy who was working security at a gun show. The deputy returned fire, killing him.
2026-11-14	Omatoyo Neverson (26)	Black	New York City, New York	Two people reported to police about seeing someone in a white cargo van, kicking and screaming. Police attempted stopped the driver before the driver started to ram police and civilian vehicles. Officers shot and killed him when less-lethal options were ineffective. A woman was recovered inside the van uninjured.
2026-11-14	unidentified male (42)	Unknown	St. Louis, Missouri	Officers received calls about a man waving a gun at people. When they found the suspect, the suspect was struggling a gun with a driver. Officers approached and distracted the suspect, allowing the driver to escape, and shot the suspect afterwards. Police later announced that the gun was a BB gun.
2026-11-13	Robert Ashley (62)	White	Akron, Ohio	OSHP troopers were requested to assist the Norton Police after Ashley fled a traffic stop. Troopers performed a PIT maneuver to disable the car. Ashley subsequently fired at troopers before being struck by returned fire.
2026-11-12	Kathy Straub (61)	White	Colorado Springs, Colorado	Police were dispatched to a Circle K at Austin Bluffs after a panic alarm went off. Officers arrived and found a woman with a gun who had robbed a gas station. The woman pointed the gun at officers when officers shot her.
2026-11-12	unidentified male	Unknown	Yulee, Florida	Nassau County deputies responded to an area for a reported home invasion. When they arrived and began to assess, a man shot and killed his father, ran out the home, and fired at deputies. Deputies fired their rifles, killing the man.
2026-11-12	unidentified male (22)	Unknown	Philadelphia, Pennsylvania	Officers pulled over a vehicle and ordered the driver to step out. The driver began acting erratically, leading to a physical confrontation. Tasers were used but ineffective. The driver later reached for a loaded gun inside the vehicle before an officer opened fire.
2026-11-11	Anthony Bryant (27)	White	Cheyenne, Wyoming	A possible stolen vehicular pursuit and foot chase occurred before Laramie County deputies fatally shot Bryant. Records show Bryant had prior felonies and sex offender registration warrants in Wyoming and Colorado.
2026-11-11	Clay Gresham (43)	Unknown	Hampton, Arkansas	Ouachita County Sheriff’s deputies responded to a domestic violence at a home where they learned the suspect, Gresham, who also had a warrant out of Dallas County had fled. After a vehicular pursuit alongside shootouts, Gresham was shot dead by an ASP trooper during the chase when he fired at them. His vehicle then left the roadway and crashed.
2026-11-11	Michael Kozak (55)	Unknown	Oklahoma City, Oklahoma	Kozak told employees at a McDonald's drive-thru that he had killed two people. Officers found Kozak and learned that he was armed. Kazak shot at police and was killed by police gunfire after a standoff. Police said there was no evidence Kozak had actually killed anyone.
2026-11-11	Zachary J. Strough (41)	White	Carthage, New York	Strough, who was wanted on a first-degree rape warrant after failing to appear in court, was shot dead by a state trooper during a traffic stop when he pointed a gun at them.
2026-11-10	Micah Lee Shepard (46)	Unknown	Columbia Falls, Montana	Flathead County deputies attempted to serve a felony warrant on Shepard for assault with a weapon at a home. Shepard came out with a gun, refused commands, before being shot.
2026-11-10	unidentified male	Unknown	Spirit Lake, North Dakota	A Bureau of Indian Affairs agent shot and killed a man on the Spirit Lake Indian Reservation under unclear circumstances. The agent was wearing an agency-issued body worn camera during the incident which was activated and captured the incident. FBI is investigating.
2026-11-10	unidentified male	Unknown	Jupiter, Florida	Two Palm Beach County deputies were dispatched to a residence following an emergency services hang-up and a subsequent call involving a crying woman. Upon arrival, the deputies heard a scream from within the home and breached the door. They observed a male suspect attempting to stab a female victim. After attempting to physically intervene without success, the deputies fatally shot the suspect.
2026-11-09	Tommy Velasco (40)	White	East Bernstadt, Kentucky	A KSP trooper pulled over Velasco for sobriety test. When the results showed signs of impairment, Velasco tried to flee on foot before a struggle broke out between the two. The trooper ultimately shot Velasco.
2026-11-09	Samuel Varelas Jr. (22)	Unknown	Warr Acres, Oklahoma	Police attempted to stop Varelas for speeding. Varelas, fled , leading officers on a vehicular pursuit before he crashed his car. Varelas subsequently ran into a yard and brandished a gun at officers. Officers shot him in response. He succumbed to his injuries four days later.
2026-11-09	unidentified male	Unknown	St. Louis, Missouri	Officers were investigating a scene of domestic assault when they encountered an armed suspect. A shootout occurred which left the suspect dead.
2026-11-08	Anthony Guzman (34)	Hispanic	New Braunfels, Texas	Off-duty Kyle Police Officer Austin Brennan was driving a pickup truck carrying five occupants, including two off-duty officers and three other passengers on FM 1102. The pickup veered to the right and Brennan overcorrected it, causing the vehicle to slide off the road and overturn. Off-duty Kyle Police Sergeant Guzman, and Arroyo, a wife of another officer, were ejected and killed on scene. Austin Brennan suffered mortal injuries and died few days later. Officials said that Brennan became an organ donor which eventually saved nine lives.
2026-11-08	Skylar Brianna Arroyo (28)	White	New Braunfels, Texas	
2026-11-08	unidentified male (50s)	Unknown	Riverside, California	A suspect threw a rock at an officer's vehicle and was armed with a knife. The officer ordered the man to stop walking away; when the man turned around, the officer fired several shots and killed him.
2026-11-08	Jair Ruenes Galvan (19)	Hispanic	McKinney, Texas	Police responded to a single-vehicle crash where they encountered Galvan. Galvan became non-complaint and refused orders before a physical altercation occurred. Galvan was shot and killed by police and an officer was wounded during the course. Galvan was unarmed.
2026-11-07	Joshua Aaron Schwartz (37)	White	Crystal River, Florida	Schwartz was involved in an altercation with a woman before placing the woman in a chokehold with a knife while holding a dog on a leash. A bystander witnessed the situation and drew his gun at Schwartz. The situation then escalated as Schwartz forced the woman to the ground and held a knife within inches of her head. Citrus County deputies arrived and shot Schwartz dead as commands were ignored. The footage had been released in a sheriff's briefing.
2026-11-07	unidentified male	White	Flagstaff, Arizona	Coconino County deputies responded to a call from a woman about her husband threatening to use a gun on himself. Deputies later found the two struggling for the gun in a trailer and ordered the man to drop it, before a deputy fired two shots and killed the man. Still images captured from the bodycam had been released.
2026-11-06	Kayan Williams (16)	White	Cedar Rapids, Iowa	Law enforcement officers were chasing a 2019 Chevrolet Impala in a four county pursuit, from Marshall County to Linn County, after the driver shot at officers and hit and occupied police vehicle. Spike strips were used to stop the driver but to no avail. Ultimately, an Iowa State Patrol police cruiser performed a PIT maneuver on the back of the Impala, leading the Impala to veer off the road toward the opposite lane, colliding with an oncoming 2004 Chevrolet Impala. The suspect, Sager, and the 2004 Chevrolet Impala driver, Williams, were killed. This incident is the second PIT maneuver-related death in Iowa in a month, since another incident in Des Moines, which also killed two individuals.
2026-11-06	Garrett Sager (36)	White	Cedar Rapids, Iowa	
2026-11-06	Jesse James West (36)	White	Kansas City, Kansas	A caller reported to KCKPD that a family member was behaving erratically in his vehicle in her driveway. When officers arrived, West was seen holding a gun in his vehicle. Officers retreated before returning to the vehicle again, at which point, an officer shot and killed West.
2026-11-06	Sean Edwards	Unknown	Bronson, Florida	Levy County Police responded to a home after Edwards threatened to blow up his neighborhood with Molotov cocktails. During the encounter, deputies confronted Edwards, who was carrying a shotgun on his back. Edwards initially complied to the commands to drop it but eventually pointed the gun at deputies, before he was fatally shot.
2026-11-06	unidentified male	Unknown	Norristown, Pennsylvania	Police responded to reports of a person trying to set cars on fire. Police shot and killed a subject for reasons unknown.
2026-11-06	unidentified male (36)	Unknown	San Antonio, Texas	Officers attempted to initiate a midnight traffic stop after arriving at a gated neighborhood in Alamo Ranch. When officers spotted the vehicle and arrived, a male passenger stepped out of the vehicle and attempted to enter the gate code. The man then pulled out a gun, prompting one officer to shoot him dead. The 21-year-old male driver shot himself in a separate occasion and died days later.
2026-11-05	unidentified male	Unknown	Wellston, Missouri	Police attempted to serve a mental health warrant on the suspect who then barricaded himself inside an excavator on the property and began destroying the property. After less-lethal efforts failed, two Hazelwood Police officers on the St. Ann Multi-Jurisdictional Special Response team shot and killed him.
2026-11-05	Sonny Miranda Mitchell (47)	Unknown	Renton, Washington	A suspect shot a firefighter while the firefighter was assisting on an EMS call. Officers heard the gunshots before they fired back and killed the suspect.
2026-11-05	Gabriel Steven Garcia (34)	Hispanic	Lakewood, Colorado	Lakewood officers responded to reports of a suspicious person. When they arrived, a suspect wha attempted to board a bus began shooting at them. A Lakewood police officer, Agent Nic Graham, was shot and killed. Three officers and a civilian were wounded by gunfire. The suspect was shot dead by police on scene.
2026-11-05	Jamie Aguilar (28)	Hispanic	Deming, New Mexico	Officers responded to reports of gunfire when they encountered Aguilar, who was fleeing the scene. A pursuing officer fatally shot him. Police later found a homicide victim.
2026-11-05	Hao Lin (39)	Asian	Chicago, Illinois	A man riding an electric scooter was fatally struck by a marked Chicago Police Ford Explorer in Bridgeport.
2026-11-05	Lionel Thomas (43)	Black	Houma, Louisiana	LSP troopers and several local officers were in a pursuit of a white unknown-modeled sedan when the car went off the road and into a nearby bayou during the pursuit near Louisiana Highway 24. As the car completely submerged underwater, the man got out of his vehicle and ran towards officers with a weapon before one officer fatally shot him dead.
2026-11-05	Bradley Cox (53)	Unknown	Villa Rica, Georgia	Douglas County deputies responded to a midnight shooting incident at a residence. When deputies arrived on scene, they discovered a man with an apparent gunshot wound. Deputies approached another man at the scene, Cox, who then retreated into his home. As SWAT was called, SWAT attempted to negotiate with Cox refused to comply with law enforcement. SWAT deployed OC gas in an attempt to remove him from the home. Cox refused to leave the home as SWAT entered the home. As SWAT officials encountered Cox in a hallway, he displayed a sword to law enforcement. Two DCSO SWAT deputies fatally shot Cox, hitting him multiple times.
2026-11-04	Tamenshia R. Ford (32)	Black	Walls, Mississippi	A Walls officer T-boned a vehicle at an intersection, killing three of the four people inside. Ford was also a DeSoto County juvenile detention officer.
2026-11-04	Eddie L. Dodson Jr. (41)	Black	Walls, Mississippi	A Walls officer T-boned a vehicle at an intersection, killing three of the four people inside. Ford was also a DeSoto County juvenile detention officer.
2026-11-04	Latasha N. Dodson (37)	Black	Walls, Mississippi	A Walls officer T-boned a vehicle at an intersection, killing three of the four people inside. Ford was also a DeSoto County juvenile detention officer.
2026-11-04	Juan Diaz (25)	Unknown	Bethlehem Township, Pennsylvania	Diaz fled a traffic stop and led state troopers on a pursuit in Hanover Township, Lehigh County in a pickup truck. During the chase, Diaz traveled on the opposite lane on U.S. Route 22 before a trooper initiated a PIT maneuver on Diaz's pickup truck. The pickup truck overturned, ejecting and killing Diaz.
2026-11-03	Tyrie Howse (16)	Black	Stockbridge, Georgia	A Henry County deputy saw two teenagers at a parking lot of a Krispy Kreme. When the deputy attempted to contact them. A teenager handed a gun to the other teeanger, Howse. Howse then ran off. After Howse ignored orders to drop the gun, the deputy shot him.
2026-11-03	Barry Lynn Martin (62)	Unknown	Fort Wayne, Indiana	FWPD officers in the southeast area arrived at a residence to serve a warrant. Martin started shooting at police during the warrant. Officers retreated, returned fire, and fatally shot Martin dead.
2026-11-03	Keith Antonio Rondell Riddick (38)	Unknown	Portsmouth, Virginia	Officers responded to a report of shots fired at a residential area. When they arrived, they found a man with a firearm. Officers negotiated with the man for a few hours before he disobeyed commands and fired his weapon at police. Officers fatally shot him dead.
2026-11-02	Alton Hamilton (72)	Black	Thomson, Georgia	Hamilton reportedly made threats of violence toward law enforcement in a 911 call. Thomson Police and McDuffie County Sheriff’s Office would later surrounded his home and set up a perimeter. When Hamilton walked out with a with a gun toward the deputies, a TPD officer shot and killed him.
2026-11-02	Joseph M. Harry (50)	White	Milwaukee, Wisconsin	During an encounter between a police sergeant and a wrong-way driver near Wisconsin Highway 175 in Washington Park, the police sergeant fatally shot the other. Police said the truck driver displayed a gun. MPD released the dashcam footage.
2026-11-01	Robert Edward Lee Napper (57)	Unknown	Florence, South Carolina	Police responded to reports of an active shooter who opened fire at several vehicles at an area where a crowd of 40 to 60 people was reported between a Mobil gas station and a Krispy Kreme between U.S. Route 52 and Interstate 95, with no injuries reported. The suspect took off east on Route 52, lost control, overturned, and crashed into a ditch before Florence County deputies arrived at the scene, who fatally shot the man dead after the man began opening fire at officers.
2026-11-01	Timothy Amundson (46)	Unknown	Post Falls, Idaho	Police responded to a report of a person making threats to themselves and family members. During the call police shot and killed the individual. Few details were immediately released.
2026-11-01	unidentified male	Unknown	Bunkie, Louisiana	A Bunkie Police officer rear-ended a tractor over the Halloween weekend (the exact date was not confirmed, possibly between October 30 and November 1), resulting in the death of its driver. Police Officer Garret Greer had been suspended without pay.
2026-11-01	Robby Warren Black Jr. (40)	White	Greenfield, Oklahoma	Deputies responded to a domestic dispute involving a man, who physically assaulted a minor prior to the incident. Black pulled out a firearm as deputies attempted to arrest him before deputies shot him dead.

== See also ==
- Death in custody § United States
- Henry A. Wallace Police Crime Public Database
- List of cases of police brutality
- List of countries with annual rates and counts for killings by law enforcement officers
- List of law enforcement officers killed in the line of duty in the United States
- List of law enforcement officers convicted for an on-duty killing in the United States
- List of shootings by US immigration agents
- List of police reforms related to the George Floyd protests
- List of unarmed African Americans killed by law enforcement officers in the United States
- Lists of killings by law enforcement officers
- Police brutality in the United States
- Police misconduct § United States
- Police riot § United States
- Police use of deadly force in the United States
