= Murder of Ee Lee =

Murder of a Hmong-American woman in Wisconsin, United States

- Location of Milwaukee within Milwaukee County, Wisconsin
- Location: Washington Park, Milwaukee, Wisconsin, U.S.
- Date: Rape and beating: September 16, 2020; Lee's death: September 19, 2020
- Attack type: Murder by beating, rape, violence against women
- Victim: Ee Lee
- Perpetrators: Kamare Lewis and Kevin Spencer
- Motive: Anti-Asian racism
- Charges: First-degree intentional homicide, first-degree sexual assault (dropped after plea deal)
- Verdict: Pleaded guilty
- Convictions: First-degree reckless homicide, second-degree sexual assault
- Sentence: Lewis: 26 years in prison, plus 19 years extended supervision Spencer: 32 years in prison, plus 20 years of extended supervision

Ee Lee (c. 1984 – September 19, 2020) was a Hmong American woman who was raped and murdered by two black teenagers in a racially-motivated daylight attack in Milwaukee, Wisconsin. The two teenage African American perpetrators, Kamare Lewis and Kevin Spencer, pleaded guilty to first-degree reckless homicide and second-degree sexual assault in 2023. Later that year, Lewis was sentenced to 26 years in prison, while Spencer was sentenced to 32 years in prison.

== Background ==
Ee Lee, a Hmong American, was originally from Thailand and grew up mostly in California. Lee had been homeless since the late 2000s, according to her sister, who described her as "going through an unstable time". Lee was 36 at the time of her death. She was survived by a fifteen-year-old son and a three-year-old daughter.

== Rape and murder ==
In the afternoon of September 16, 2020, Ee Lee was sitting on a blanket in Washington Park after buying food at a nearby Asian supermarket when she was attacked by a group of teenagers, who initially intended to rob her. Lee was punched and kicked several times before the youths dragged her to a treeline near Washington Park Lagoon, where she was raped by then-17-year-old Kamare Lewis and then-15-year-old Kevin Spencer while nine others watched. During and after the assault, Lee was beaten with tree branches and then left for dead by the group, who subsequently left the park on foot and bicycles. She was found half-clothed and unconscious, but still breathing at around 9:30 pm. Video footage shows that the perpetrators directed anti-Chinese slurs against the victim. She was taken to Froedtert Hospital for treatment but died three days later.

== Legal proceedings ==
On February 6, 2021, two local African American teenagers, Kamare R. Lewis, 17, and Kevin T. Spencer, 15, were arrested and charged with first-degree intentional homicide and first-degree sexual assault with an aggravating factor of great bodily harm. Lewis had recorded the rape and murder on his phone and had shared the video with his friends. Approximately nine other youths were present in the video. Spencer confessed to raping and murdering Lee. Spencer was involved in another murder in December 2020.

According to the criminal complaint in two different interviews, one of the perpetrators said that they never called for help at all because he thought she was dead or soon to be dead and it "wouldn't have made a difference and that he didn't really care about her at all because she is not someone he knows personally."

=== Guilty pleas ===
On March 16, 2023, both Kamare Lewis and Kevin Spencer entered plea deals for the lesser offenses of first-degree reckless homicide and second-degree sexual assault, with the previous charges of first-degree intentional homicide and first-degree sexual assault dropped. Instead of facing a life sentence as they previously had, they faced 15 to 80 years in prison.

On June 16, 2023, Lewis was sentenced to 26 years in prison plus 19 years of extended supervision upon release. Spencer was sentenced on August 3 to 32 years in prison, plus 20 years of extended supervision.

== Response ==
Vigils were held for Lee by the Hmong American Women's Association and broader Wisconsin Hmong community.

== See also ==
- 1995 Okinawa rape incident - Rape of an Okinawan elementary school student by three American servicemen
- 2021 Atlanta spa shootings—Killing of eight people, six of whom were Asian women, at an Atlanta massage parlor
- Hmong in Wisconsin
