= Shad-Wyck =

Defunct American motor vehicle manufacturer

The Shad-Wyck was an American automobile manufactured from 1917 until 1918 in Frankfort, Indiana.

== History ==
Run by the automobile dealer Shadburne Brothers of Chicago, the company's initial offerings seem to have been rebranded Bour-Davis cars. The name of the car was meant to invoke the famous Chadwick and advertising used images of the Roamer to represent a Shad-Wyck.

Bour-Davis had been purchased by the brothers and production moved from Detroit to Frankfort. They announced that they would also be producing cars to their own designs but there is doubt if this ever happened. Bour-Davis was sold again to the Louisiana Motor Car Company and moved to Shreveport where production continued until 1923.

The Shadborne Brothers returned to Chicago and a new line of Shad-Wyck models was announced as late as 1920. No cars were actually made.
