= Murder of Shad Thyrion =

2022 murder in Wisconsin, US

- Green Bay (Wisconsin)
- Location: 44°30′48″N 88°0′57″W; Green Bay, Wisconsin, U.S.
- Date: February 21, 2022
- Attack type: Murder by strangulation, rape, dismemberment
- Weapons: Chain, knives
- Victim: Shad Thyrion
- Perpetrator: Taylor Schabusiness
- Motive: Sexual gratification
- Verdict: Guilty on all charges
- Convictions: First-degree intentional homicide; Mutilating a corpse; Third-degree sexual assault
- Sentence: Life imprisonment without the possibility of parole, plus 10 1/2 years
- Judge: Thomas Walsh

Between February 21, 2022 and February 23, 2022, Shad Thyrion, a 24-year-old American man, was murdered and dismembered by his lover, Taylor Schabusiness. Thyrion's severed head was discovered by his mother, Tara Pakanich, in a bucket in the basement of their family home in Green Bay, Wisconsin. Other severed body parts, including Thyrion's dissected torso in a storage tote, were later discovered by police.

Schabusiness, who was involved in a sexual relationship with Thyrion, admitted to strangling him to death during sexual intercourse while they were both intoxicated with methamphetamine and prescription drugs. She continued to have sex with Thyrion's body before dismembering, removing internal organs from, and mutilating it.

Schabusiness was arrested and charged with murder, mutilating a corpse, and rape. On July 26, 2023, a jury convicted her on all three counts. Sentencing took place on September 26 with Schabusiness sentenced to life in prison without the possibility of parole.

== Murder ==
On February 21, 2022, at around 9:30 p.m., Thyrion was picked up from the home of his mother, Tara Pakanich, by Taylor Schabusiness (née Coronado), with whom he had a sexual relationship. The couple, joined by a friend, went to an apartment on Eastman Avenue and smoked cannabis. Schabusiness stated in her interrogation that she and Thyrion also smoked methamphetamine and injected trazodone at the apartment after the friend left. The couple then returned to Thyrion's mother's house. Pakanich and her boyfriend, Steve Hendricks, were away at the time.

They then went down to the basement and began engaging in sexual intercourse. Schabusiness claimed that they had engaged in erotic asphyxiation in prior encounters and on this occurrence, they had used metal chains. Schabusiness then proceeded to strangle Thyrion until he started to cough up blood. She continued until Thyrion was deceased, which took around 3 to 5 minutes.

Schabusiness then proceeded to perform oral sex and use sex toys on the body for several hours afterwards. The following morning, she dismembered the body using knives she found at the house. Schabusiness positioned the body on the bed and beheaded it over a bucket and a storage tote to contain the blood. She then dumped the blood down the basement shower drain. She also removed the organs and placed them in plastic bags, the tote, cardboard boxes, and the bucket.

== Investigation ==
In the early morning hours of February 23, 2022, Thyrion's mother, after hearing the house door shut and going downstairs to check on whether her son was still down there or if he also left with Schabusiness, found his head in a bucket in the basement. It had been covered with a towel. Later, police would discover Thyrion's removed penis in the bucket as well. Hendricks then called the police who did a search of the basement and found human organs stuffed into plastic bags and cardboard boxes. His torso was discovered in the tote with his severed foot placed inside it. Additional body parts including the other foot were also found later in a crock pot box inside Schabusiness's minivan.

Police found Schabusiness later that day at an apartment complex on Eastman Avenue, which is where a gold Town and Country minivan, used to transport various body parts of Thyrion, was found by police. Her clothes were covered in blood and her left thumb had a cut. She also had scratches on her arms which she claimed were self-inflicted. She was arrested and charged with murder, mutilation of a corpse, and third-degree sexual assault on March 1. Schabusiness, earlier that year on January 3, was convicted and sentenced for 3 months for fleeing, eluding, and obstructing police. It is unclear if she was on work release at the time of the murder. She had removed a GPS tracker from her ankle.

== Trial and incarceration ==
Schabusiness's attorney, Quinn Jolly, submitted a not guilty by reason of insanity plea on September 1, 2022.

On February 14, 2023, Schabusiness attacked Jolly after he requested the trial date be pushed back so experts could determine her competency to stand trial. Schabusiness was tackled by a Brown County sheriff's officer. No one was seriously injured. Around ten minutes after the attack, Jolly told Judge Walsh he planned to file a motion to be removed from the case. He was replaced by Christopher Froelich on March 3, who requested that Walsh recuse himself as his witnessing the attack could affect his ruling. Walsh declined.

On July 26, a jury convicted Schabusiness of first-degree intentional homicide, mutilation of a corpse, and third-degree sexual assault. On September 26, Walsh sentenced Schabusiness to life imprisonment without the possibility of parole. Walsh said he had to protect the public from her. "This crime offends human decency, it offends human dignity, it offends the human community. It really does", he said. Thyrion's father forgave Schabusiness, saying, "I believe everybody makes bad choices, maybe not to this scale. It does no good to hate you. I know you've got a heart, got a mind."

Schabusiness is serving out her sentence at the Taycheedah Correctional Institution, a facility housing only female inmates that is located in the city of Fond du Lac. In December 2025 while incarerated, Schabusiness was sentenced to 90 days for attacking staff members.
