= Samson (gorilla) =

Gorilla

- Samson in his enclosure
- Species: Western Lowland Gorilla (Gorilla gorilla gorilla)
- Sex: Male
- Born: Captured 1949, wild-born
- Died: November 27, 1981 (Aged 32); Milwaukee, Wisconsin, US
- Resting place: Donated to science
- Known for: Main attraction of the Milwaukee Zoo
- Residence: Milwaukee County Zoo
- Mate: Terra
- Weight: 652 lb (296 kg)

Samson (1949– November 27, 1981) was a male silverback western lowland gorilla given to the Washington Park Zoo in Milwaukee, Wisconsin, by the Pabst Brewing Company. Samson reached a weight of 652 lb (296 kg) and lived alone in a glass enclosure. He often hit the windows in frustration and managed to break the glass four times. He was moved to the Milwaukee County Zoo in 1959, and quickly became the main attraction. Samson was one of the largest gorillas in captivity.

== Main attraction ==
Samson was the main attraction for the Washington Park Zoo in Milwaukee from the moment he arrived. The Zoo celebrated his fifth birthday with soda and a cake in front of his cage. Samson attracted huge crowds that came to see him in his tiled stall every day. He appeared on television, in magazines and even on a Milwaukee bus pass. Because of Samson's isolation, glass pounding, and expressions, people saw him as sad, bored and lonely. His poor living conditions also seemed to contribute to that belief.

== Death and legacy ==
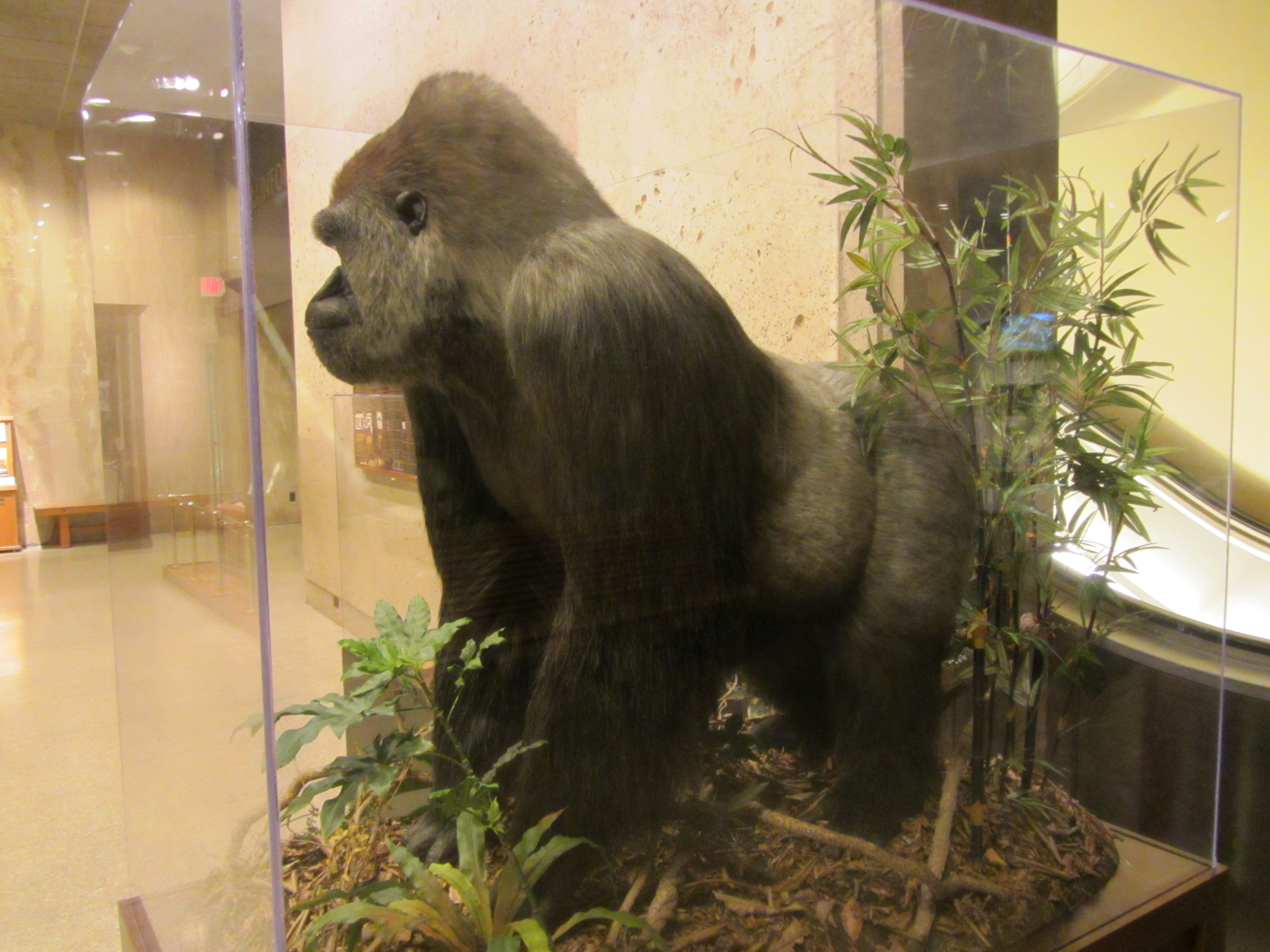
A re-creation model of Samson

Samson died November 27, 1981. After Samson's death, the Milwaukee County Zoo preserved his semen for use in attempted insemination of several gorillas from other zoos. The inseminations all failed. Samson is now honored with a bronze statue of his head near the gorilla exhibit at the zoo.

The Milwaukee Public Museum recreated Samson in an exhibit: Samson Remembered. The recreation of Samson was done by Wendy Christensen in 2007.

== See also ==
- Milwaukee County Zoo
- Washington Park (Milwaukee)
- List of individual apes
