= Louisiana Motor Car Company =

Defunct American motor vehicle manufacturer previously based in Louisiana

The Louisiana Motor Car was an American automobile manufacturer located in Shreveport, Louisiana, during the 1910s and early 1920s. The company is most known for its production of the Bour-Davis automobile between 1918 and 1923.

== History ==
Located in Shreveport, the Louisiana Motor Car Company was one of the thousands of small, independent auto companies which sprung up across America in the late 1910s and early 1920s. The company's founding came amidst a wider social movement described as the "classic era" of automobiles, in which automobiles became more affordable for consumers, and their manufacture became more necessary for society.

The Louisiana Motor Car Company produced cars by assembling pieces purchased from various suppliers like Continental Motors. The company's showroom was in downtown Shreveport in the Uneeda Building, while manufacturing took place in Cedar Grove, Louisiana.
