= Bour-Davis =

Defunct American motor vehicle manufacturer

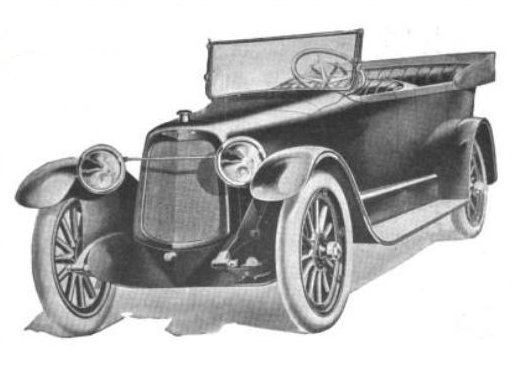

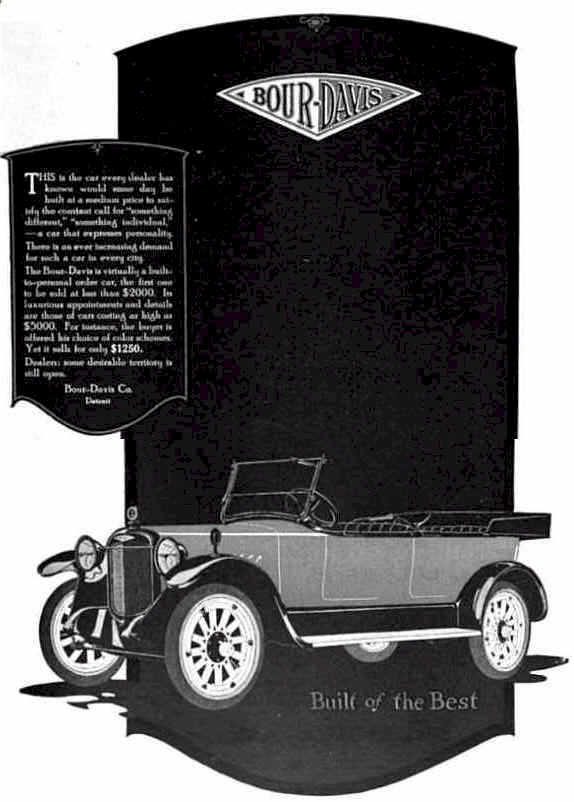
1916 Bour-Davis ad

The Bour-Davis was an American automobile manufactured from 1916 until 1922. The car took its name from two of the founders of the company; Robert C Davis and Charles J Bour. Production of the car was started in Detroit, before moving to Frankfort, Indiana, in 1917. In 1918, the automobile's manufacturing rights were acquired by the Louisiana Motor Car Company and production was moved to Cedar Grove, Louisiana. A distinctive feature of the Model 17 and Model 18B cars built in Detroit and Frankfort was the slightly slanted and pointed radiator. Prices ranged from $1250 to $1500 in 1916, rising to $1650 in 1919.

Bour-Davis had been purchased by the brothers, and production moved from Detroit to Frankfort.

In 1917 the company was taken over by the Shadburne Brothers of Chicago, who reorganised the company, with production now located in Frankfort, Indiana. They announced that they would also be producing cars to their own designs but there is doubt if this ever happened. Bour-Davis was sold again to the Louisiana Motor Car Company and moved to Shreveport, Louisiana, where production continued until 1923.

The Louisiana Motor Company placed heavy emphasis on the Bour-Davis's new home, with the car being referred to as the "Pride of Shreveport". A contest was held amongst readers of the Shreveport Times for a new name for the car. Although the name "Louisianne" was chosen, this name was never adopted. Features of the Bour-Davis included a radiator placed slightly ahead of the front axle, and the continuation of the leather front seat over the seat's top and down to the rear floor. The Model 21 and Model 21S were powered by a Continental Straight-6 engine, with prices ranging from $1700 for a 1920 Model 20 tourer, up to $2300 for a 1922 Model 21S tourer.

In 1923 the company was taken over by JM Ponder and the Ponder Motor Manufacturing Company, but lack of finance lead to production never occurring. Total production of the Bour-Davis between 1916 and 1922 was approximately 1500 cars.

== See also ==
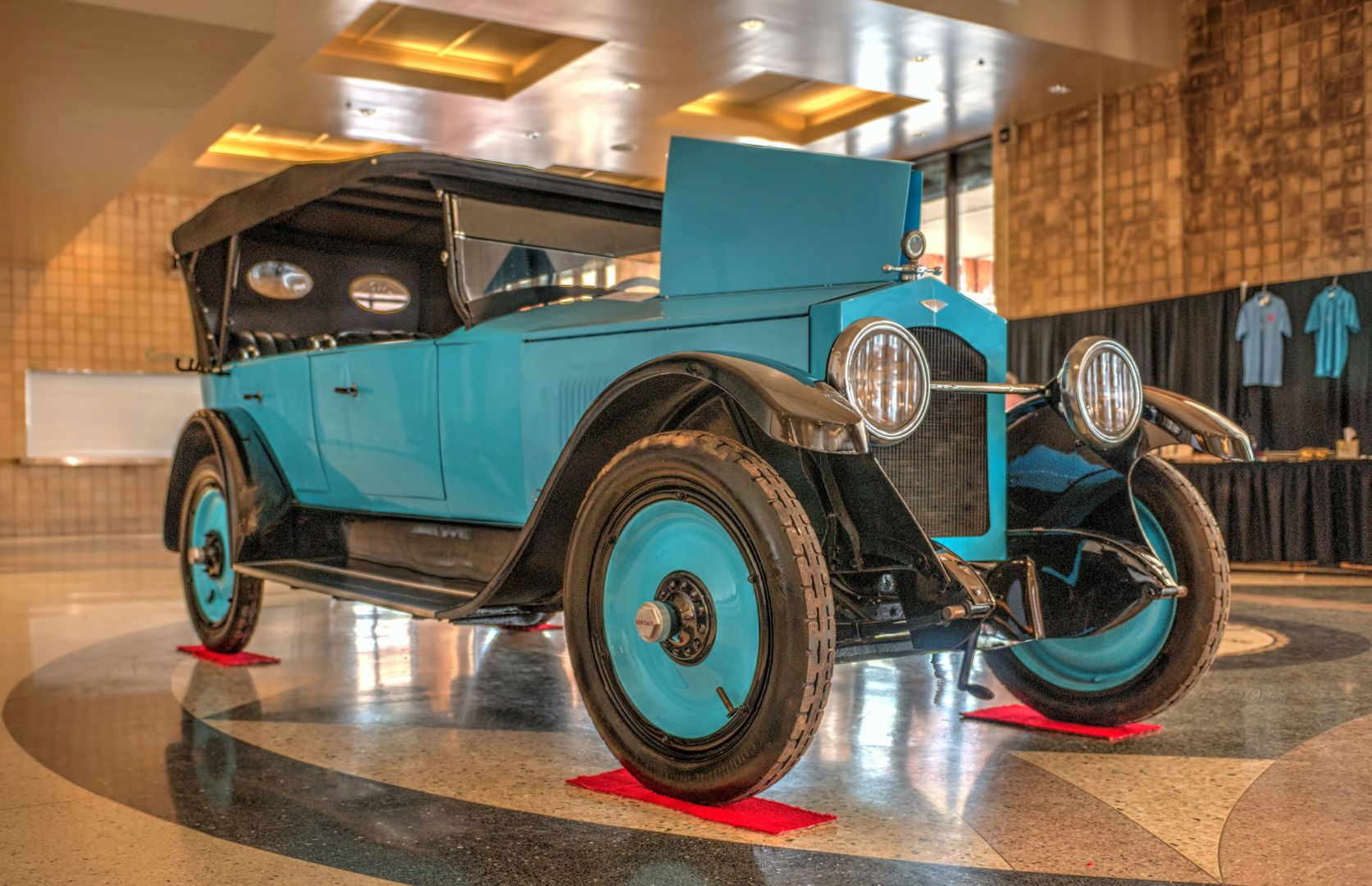
Bour-Davis 1921 Model 21S Touring Car

- List of automobile manufacturers
- List of defunct automobile manufacturers
