= Murder in Wisconsin law =

Aspect of an American state's law

Murder in Wisconsin law constitutes the intentional killing, under circumstances defined by law, of people within or under the jurisdiction of the U.S. state of Wisconsin.

The United States Centers for Disease Control and Prevention reported that in the year 2020, the state had a murder rate slightly below the median for the entire country.

In 2003, the Wisconsin Supreme Court upheld the year and a day rule in the case before it, but simultaneously abolished the rule for any later cases, noting the modern circumstances of homicide cases, in which there is "the specter of a family's being forced to choose between terminating the use of a life-support system and allowing an accused to escape a murder charge" and the court's finding that it is "unjust to permit an assailant to escape punishment because of a convergence of modern medical advances and an archaic rule from the thirteenth century".

== Definitions ==
=== First-degree intentional homicide ===
First-degree intentional homicide in Wisconsin is defined as causing the death of another human or an unborn child with the intent to kill that person, or of a fetus an intent to kill the pregnant woman or unborn child. The defendant's actions do not have to be the only factor in a person's death, just a significant one. It is punished by life in prison with or without the possibility of parole.

=== Second-degree intentional homicide ===
Second-degree intentional homicide is defined as a downgraded version of first-degree intentional homicide, with one of the following mitigating factors present.

- Adequate provocation - The death was caused under the influence of a provocation that caused the defendant to lose self-control and would do so in an ordinary person, or a "heat of passion" killing.
- Unnecessary defensive force - The defendant genuinely believed they or another person was in imminent danger of death or serious physical injury and that the force they used was necessary to defend whoever was endangered, but the belief of danger or the force being necessary was not reasonable.
- Prevention of a felony - The defendant believed that the force used was necessary to prevent or stop a felony, but that belief was unreasonable.

Second-degree intentional homicide is punished by a minimum of 15 years in prison and a maximum of 60 years in prison. For older offenders, a maximum sentence for second-degree intentional homicide can be a de facto life sentence.

=== Felony murder ===
In Wisconsin, the felony murder rule is found in Wis. Stat. Sec. 940.03 and was last revised in 2005. Generally, the statute applies to dangerous felonies, felonies that have a propensity to cause great bodily harm, or those that involve a dangerous weapon or even a facade of a weapon. Sentences adding felony murder are enhanced by a maximum of 15 years, plus whatever the maximum of the underlying felony awards.

Crimes in the felony murder statute in Wisconsin are:

- Battery, including that to an unborn child
- Sexual assault of the first degree, or second degree if it is by use or threat of force or violence
- False imprisonment
- Kidnapping
- Arson of buildings or damage of property by explosives
- Burglary with a dangerous weapon, explosives, or burglary of any inhabited dwelling
- Carjacking
- Robbery with a dangerous weapon, or even with an object that leads someone to believe there is a dangerous weapon

=== Reckless homicide ===
Two less severe murder offenses in Wisconsin law are first- and second-degree reckless homicide. First-degree reckless homicide is defined as recklessly causing the death of another human being under circumstances which show utter disregard for human life. Though it is a lesser offense compared with first-degree intentional homicide, first-degree reckless homicide is still extremely serious, as it is punished as severely as second-degree intentional homicide with a minimum of 15 years in prison and a maximum of 60 years in prison. For older offenders, a maximum sentence for first-degree reckless homicide can be a de facto life sentence.

Second-degree reckless homicide is recklessly causing the death of another human being, without the element of showing utter disregard for human life. It is punishable by up to 25 years in prison.

== Penalties ==
| Offense | Mandatory sentencing |
|---|---|
| Negligent homicide | Up to 5 years in prison plus 5 years extended supervision |
| Second-degree reckless homicide | Up to 15 years in prison plus 10 years extended supervision |
| Felony murder | 15 years in prison plus sentence for the underlying felony |
| First-degree reckless homicide | Up to 40 years in prison plus 20 years extended supervision |
| Second-degree intentional homicide | Up to 40 years in prison plus 20 years extended supervision |
| First-degree intentional homicide | Life imprisonment with or without the possibility of extended supervision |
