= Washington Park (Milwaukee) =

Park in Milwaukee, Wisconsin

Coordinates: 43.053°N 87.968°W

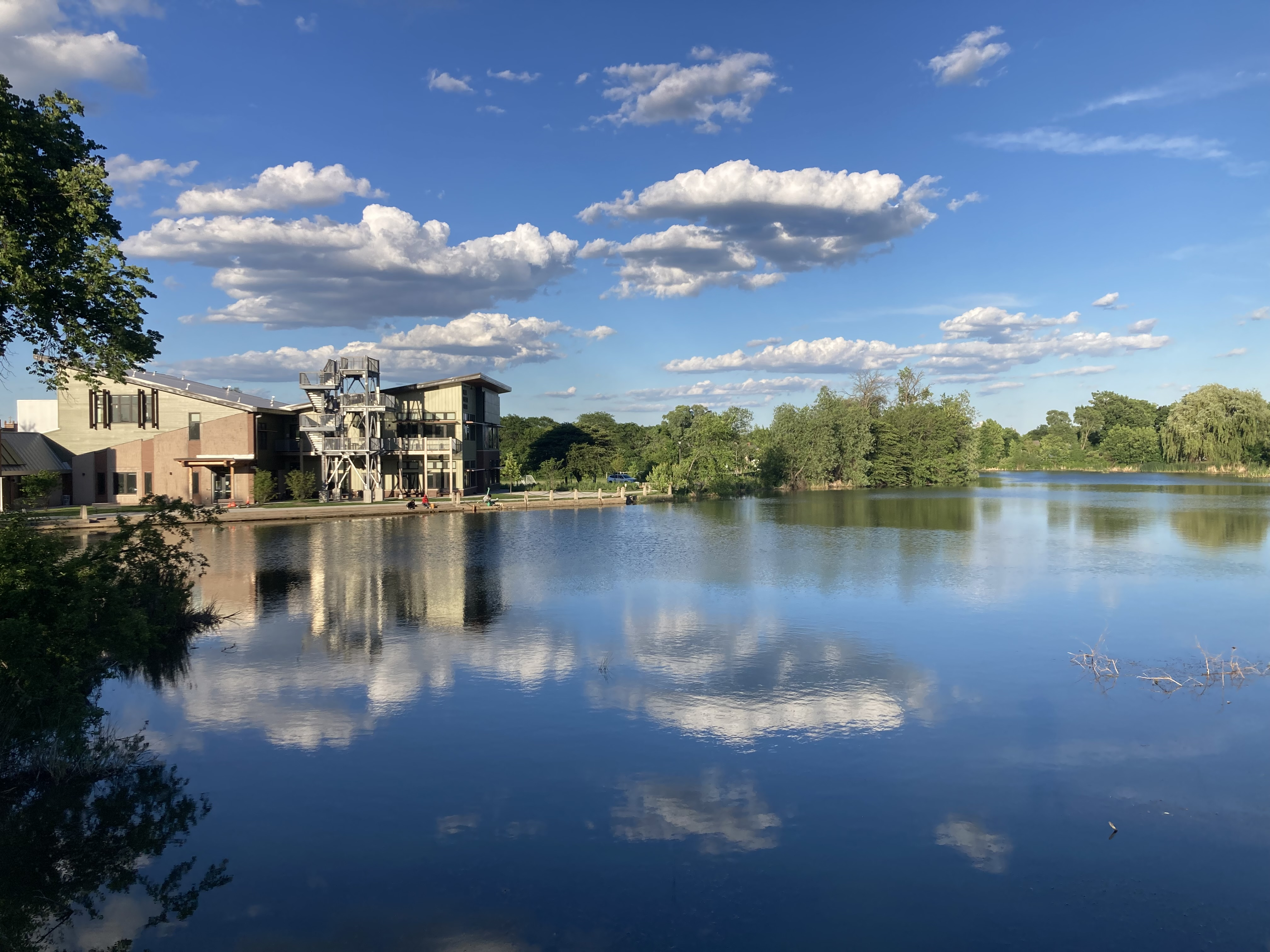
Washington Park lagoon

Washington Park (1900) originally called West Park is a park in Milwaukee, Wisconsin, in the United States. From 1892–1958 the park was home to the Milwaukee County Zoo. It is one of the oldest parks in Milwaukee and it was added to the Wisconsin Architecture and History Inventory in 2019.

== History ==
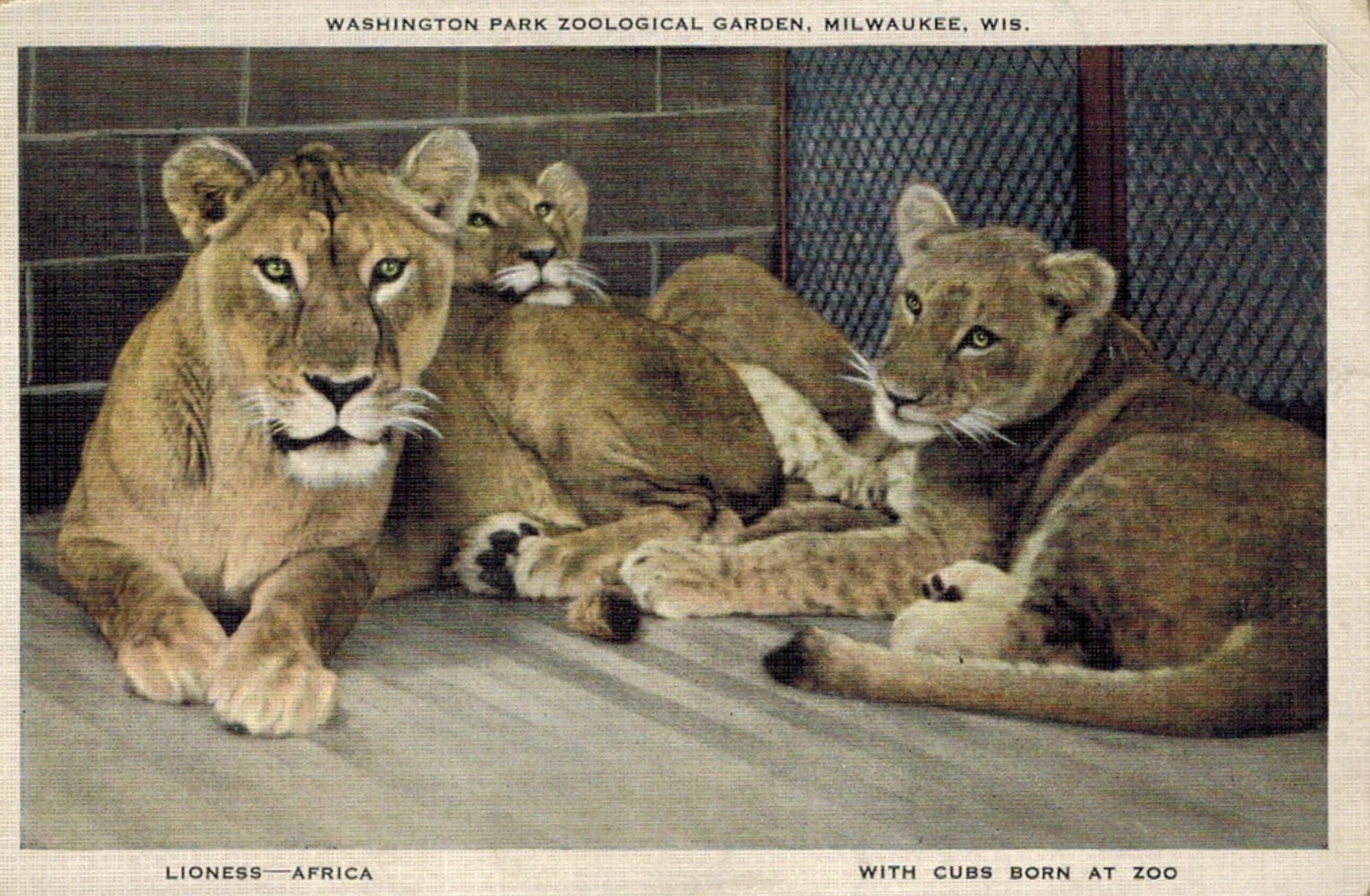
1937 postcard of a lion and her cubs, Washington Park Zoo Milwaukee Wisconsin

The park was originally called West Park after the city purchased the 128.5 acres in 1891. The park is one of the oldest in the Milwaukee County Parks system. The Wisconsin Historical Society has said that the land was purchased for $387,793.75 USD.

In 1900 the park was renamed Washington Park. The park's designer was landscape architect Frederick Law Olmsted. The city of Milwaukee placed their first Zoo in the park and it remained there from the park's opening in 1892 until 1958. The neighborhood around the park came to be known as the Washington Park neighborhood of Milwaukee. The Wisconsin Historical Society surveyed the property in 2019 and added it to the Wisconsin Architecture and History Inventory.

The Zoo had a Gorilla named Samson. The Gorilla was the main attraction for the Washington Park Zoo in Milwaukee from the moment he arrived in 1950. The Zoo celebrated his fifth birthday with soda and a cake in front of his cage.

In 2020, the Murder of Ee Lee took place in Washington Park. She was repeatedly raped and beaten by teenagers and left for dead.

In the fall of 2022, the road through the park was renamed from Washington Park Boulevard to Olmsted Way to honor its architect.

== Design ==
Olmsted's design called for bridges, ponds, lagoons and trees and shrubs. The design eventually included a zoo, and there was also a one mile horse racing track. The park also had other sports facilities including grass tennis courts and a six hole golf course. In 1938 Emil Blatz built a bandshell in the park and it was called the Blatz Temple of Music.

== See also ==
- Parks of Milwaukee
