= Rape laws in the United States =

Rape laws vary across the United States jurisdictions. However, rape is federally defined (even though individual state definitions may differ) for statistical purposes as:

Penetration, no matter how slight, of the vagina or anus with any body part or object, or oral penetration by a sex organ of another person, without the consent of the victim.

— Uniform Crime Report

== Terminology ==
Laws use various terms to define aspects of instances of rape or sexual assault, including the acts themselves, the alleged perpetrator and the alleged victim, and whether they are or have been married to each other or someone else.

- Penetrative acts:
  - rape, or carnal knowledge (generally vaginal, sometimes also anal or oral)
  - sodomy, unnatural intercourse, or crime against nature (only anal, generally between two men, sometimes also a man to a woman) (Note: Prosecution banned in consensual cases as per Lawrence v. Texas.)
  - sexual abuse (when a victim was incapable of consenting due to age, or otherwise in an unequal power relation with the accused)
  - sexual assault (can also be non-penetrative)
  - sexual battery
  - sexual intercourse or (mis)conduct (generally vaginal, sometimes also oral and anal)
  - deviate sexual intercourse or (mis)conduct (only oral and anal, sometimes any form of sexual intercourse with animals)
  - infamous crime against nature (only oral and anal, and any form of sexual intercourse with animals; unclear whether it prohibits non-penetrative cunnilingus)
- Non-penetrative acts: indecent contact, sexual assault (can also be penetrative)
- Accused: accused, actor, author, defendant, (alleged) perpetrator, person, suspect
- Accuser: accuser, complainant, person, the other person, (alleged) victim
- Husband (male) or wife (female): spouse, spousal or marital (adjective)

Furthermore, each state or federal agency may define sexual consent differently, if they do so at all. Some may only define the circumstances in which a person is incapable of consenting, and assume implied consent on a person in every other situation. They often require said person to resist any unwanted sexual advances, or that these advances only become criminal when the accused can be shown to have used some kind of force or coercion (which the accuser was incapable of resisting – though this is not always required) to commit the unwanted sexual advances upon the accuser. Other U.S. states and federal agencies afford each person voluntary, freely given or affirmative consent, which must first be obtained by someone else before being allowed to have sex with said person, and that this consent can be revoked at any time by said person.

== Federal ==
=== Civilian ===
Federal law applies in federal areas and in cases of displacement between states:

Offense	Article	Mandatory sentencing
Sexual abuse	18 U.S. Code § 2242	Life without parole (Note: Since 1986, there is no parole in the federal system.) or any other term
Aggravated sexual abuse by force or threat	18 U.S. Code § 2241(a)	Life without parole or any other term
Aggravated sexual abuse by other means	18 U.S. Code § 2241(b)	Life without parole or any other term
Aggravated sexual abuse with children	18 U.S. Code § 2241(c)	Life imprisonment without parole or any term not less than 30 years

=== Military ===
The United States military has an offense of rape and another of sodomy. The Uniform Code of Military Justice (UCMJ) of the United States Armed Forces regards sex without consent as rape or sexual assault; it provides a definition of consent and examples of illegitimate inferrals of consent in § 920. Art. 120. "Rape and sexual assault generally" (g) 7 and 8.

Offense	Article	Mandatory sentencing
Rape	10 U.S. Code § 920 – Art. 120(a)	"as a court-martial may direct" (Note: Life or any lesser sentence of years, with a mandatory minimum of dismissal or dishonorable discharge.)
Forcible Sodomy	10 U.S. Code § 925 – Art. 125(a)	Life without parole or any other term

=== District of Columbia ===
In the District of Columbia, "sexual act" means "sexual intercourse".

Offense	Article	Mandatory sentencing
First Degree Sexual Abuse	DC Code § 22–3002	Up to 30 years (sentence can exceed 30 years if there are aggravating circumstances) or life without parole
Second Degree Sexual Abuse	DC Code § 22–3003	Up to 20 years
First Degree Child Sexual Abuse	DC Code § 22–3008	Up to 30 years (sentence can exceed 30 years if there are aggravating circumstances) or life without parole
First degree sexual abuse of a secondary education student	DC Code § 22–3009.03	Up to 10 years
First degree sexual abuse of a ward, patient, client, or prisoner	DC Code § 22–3013	Up to 10 years
First degree sexual abuse of a patient or client	DC Code § 22–3015	Up to 10 years

== States ==
Coercion-based law (all penetrative sex) Consent-based law (anal and oral sex) Consent-based law (vaginal, anal and oral sex) Mixed legislation; coerced sexual penetration treated as a separate, more severe crime

Coercion-based law (non-penetrative sex) Consent-based law (non-penetrative sex)

Some U.S. states recognize penetrative sex without consent by the victim and without the use of force by the perpetrator as a crime (usually called 'rape'). Other states do not recognize this as a crime; their laws stipulate that the perpetrator must have used some kind of force or coercion (physical violence (that results in demonstrable physical injury), threats against the victim or a third party, or some other form of coercion) in order for such nonconsensual penetrative sex to amount to a crime. Similarly, some states recognize non-penetrative sex acts (contact such as fondling or touching a person's intimate parts, or exposure of a body or sexual activity) without consent by the victim and without the use of force by the perpetrator as a crime, while other states do not.

=== Alabama ===
Alabama divide its dispositions against forced sexual intercourse in sodomy and rape; in addition, the crime of "sexual torture" describes "rape by instrumentation".

Offense	Article	Mandatory sentencing
Rape in the first degree	AL Code § 13A-6-61	Between 10 and 99 years, or life
Rape in the second degree	AL Code § 13A-6-62	Between 2 and 20 years
Sodomy in the first degree	AL Code § 13A-6-63	Between 10 and 99 years, or life
Sodomy in the second degree	AL Code § 13A-6-64	Between 2 and 20 years
Sexual torture	AL Code § 13A-6-65.1	Between 10 and 99 years, or life

=== Alaska ===
Offense	Article	Mandatory sentencing
Sexual assault in the first degree	AS §11.41.410	99 years or less (Note: For the first offense, presumptive ranges are as follows: 1. If the victim is less than 13 years of age: 25 to 35 years' imprisonment.; 2. If the victim is 13 years of age or older: 20 to 30 years' imprisonment.; 3. If the offender used a dangerous instrument, a firearm, or caused serious physical injury: 25 to 35 years' imprisonment.; Offenders who have been previously convicted of felonies face additional time in prison.)
Sexual assault in the second degree	AS §11.41.420	99 years or less
Sexual assault in the third degree	AS §11.41.425	99 years or less
Sexual assault in the fourth degree	AS §11.41.427	1 year or less
Sexual abuse of a minor in the first degree	AS §11.41.434	Between 20 and 99 years
Sexual abuse of a minor in the second degree	AS §11.41.436	Between 5 and 99 years
Sexual abuse of a minor in the third degree	AS §11.41.438	5 years or less
Sexual abuse of a minor in the fourth degree	AS §11.41.440	1 year or less

=== Arizona ===
Arizona sentencing laws make the prison term dependent on several factors such as the age of the victim or the criminal record of the offender.

Offense	Article	Mandatory sentencing
Sexual conduct with a minor when victim under 15	Ariz. Rev. Stat. Ann. §13-1405	Between 13 and 27 years
Sexual conduct with a minor when victim between 15 and 18	Ariz. Rev. Stat. Ann. §13-1405	Between 3 and 8.775 years
Sexual conduct with a minor in all other cases	Ariz. Rev. Stat. Ann. §13-1405	Between 6 months and 2.5 years
Unlawful sexual conduct by adult probation department employees or juvenile court employees when victim between 15 and 18	Ariz. Rev. Stat. Ann. §13-1409	Between 3 and 8.775 years
Unlawful sexual conduct by adult probation department employees or juvenile court employees in all other cases	Ariz. Rev. Stat. Ann. §13-1409	Between 6 months and 2.5 years
Unlawful sexual conduct by peace officers when victim under 15	Ariz. Rev. Stat. Ann. §13-1412	Between 13 and 27 years
Unlawful sexual conduct by peace officers when victim between 15 and 18	Ariz. Rev. Stat. Ann. §13-1412	Between 3 and 8.775 years
Unlawful sexual conduct by peace officers in all other cases	Ariz. Rev. Stat. Ann. §13-1412	Between 6 months and 2.5 years
Unlawful sexual conduct in correctional facilities by employee when victim under 15	Ariz. Rev. Stat. Ann. §13-1419	Between 13 and 27 years
Unlawful sexual conduct in correctional facilities by employee when victim between 15 and 18	Ariz. Rev. Stat. Ann. §13-1419	Between 3 and 8.775 years
Unlawful sexual conduct in correctional facilities by employee in all other cases	Ariz. Rev. Stat. Ann. §13-1419	Between 6 months and 2.5 years

=== Arkansas ===
Offense	Article	Mandatory sentencing
Rape	AR Code § 5-14-103	Life or between 10 and 40 years (minimum of 25 years if victim is under 14)
Sexual assault in the first degree	AR Code § 5-14-124	Between 6 and 30 years
Sexual assault in the second degree	AR Code § 5-14-125(B)(b)(1)	Between 5 and 20 years
Sexual assault in the second degree when victim under 14 and not married to the offender	AR Code § 5-14-125(B)(b)(2)	Up to 6 years
Sexual assault in the third degree	AR Code § 5-14-126	Between 3 and 10 years
Sexual assault in the fourth degree	AR Code § 5-14-127(a)(1)(A)	Up to 6 years

=== California ===
California separates rape, sodomy and rape by instrumentation.

Offense	Article	Mandatory sentencing
Rape	Cal. Penal Code §§ 261, 264(a)	3, 6 or 8 years
Rape when victim under 14	Cal. Penal Code §§ 261, 264(c)(1)	9, 11 or 13 years
Rape when victim between 14 and 18	Cal. Penal Code §§ 261, 264(c)(2)	7, 9 or 11 years
Sex with a child under 10, and the defendant is 18 or older	Cal. Penal Code § 287(a)(b)	15 years to life, 25 years to life, or life without the possibility of parole (depends on the aggravating factors)
Rape of a spouse	Cal. Penal Code §§ 262, 264(a)	3, 6 or 8 years
Rape of a spouse when victim under 14	Cal. Penal Code §§ 262, 264(c)(1)	9, 11 or 13 years
Rape of a spouse when victim between 14 and 18	Cal. Penal Code §§ 262, 264(c)(2)	7, 9 or 11 years
Sodomy	Cal. Penal Code § 286	Depends from the circumstances (Note: Lists of circumstances: 1. with a victim under 18 years of age (punishable by up to one year's imprisonment); 2. with a victim where the offender is over the age of 21 and the victim is under 16 (punishable as a felony); 3. with a victim who is under 14 years of age and more than 10 years younger than the offender (punishable by 3, 6, or 8 years' imprisonment); 4. with a victim and accomplishing the act by means of force, violence, duress, menace, or fear of immediate and unlawful bodily injury on the victim or any other person (punishable by 3, 6, or 8 years' imprisonment); 5. with a victim who is under 14 years of age by means of force, violence, duress, menace, or fear of immediate and unlawful bodily injury on the victim or another person (punishable by 9, 11, or 13 years' imprisonment); 6. with a victim who is a minor older than 14 years of age by means of force, violence, duress, menace, or fear of immediate and unlawful bodily injury on the victim or another person (punishable by 7, 9, or 11 years' imprisonment); 7. with a victim and accomplishing the act by threatening to retaliate in the future against the victim or any other person and there is a reasonable possibility that the perpetrator will execute the threat (punishable by 3, 6, or 8 years); 8. with a victim by, acting or by aiding and abetting another, and accomplishes the act by means of force or fear of immediate and unlawful bodily injury on the victim or another person or where the act is accomplished against the victim's will by threatening to retaliate in the future against the victim or any other person and there is a reasonable possibility that the perpetrator will execute the threat (punishable by 5, 7 or 9 years' imprisonment); 9. with a victim who is under 14 years of age, while acting in concert with another person, either personally or aiding and abetting another, and accomplishing the act against the victim's will by means of force or fear of immediate and unlawful bodily injury on the victim or another person (punishable by 10, 12, or 14 years' imprisonment); 10. with a minor who is older than 14 years of age, while acting in concert with another person and either personally committing the act or aiding and abetting another person, and accomplishing the act by means of force or fear of immediate and unlawful bodily injury on the victim or another person (punishable by 7, 9, or 11 years' imprisonment); 11. with a victim of any age while confined in a detention facility (punishable by less than 1 year's imprisonment); 12. with a victim who is unconscious of the nature of the act (incapable of resisting because they are asleep or unconscious; not aware, knowing, perceiving, or cognizant of the act; was not aware or cognizant of the essential characteristics of the act due to the perpetrator's fraud in fact; or was not aware or cognizant of the essential characteristics of the act due to the perpetrator's fraudulent representation that the sexual penetration served a professional purpose when it did not) and this is known to the person committing the act (punishable by 3, 6, or 8 years' imprisonment); 13. with a victim who is incapable of giving consent due to mental disorder or physical or developmental disability and the offender knows (or should have known) the victim is unable to consent (punishable by 3, 6, or 8 years' imprisonment); 14. with a victim who is incapable of giving consent due to mental disorder or disability and the offender knows (or should have known) the victim is unable to consent BUT at the time both the offender and victim were institutionalized for the treatment of mental disorders (punishable by less than 1 year's imprisonment); 15. with a victim who is prevented from resisting by a substance and the offender knew (or should have known) of the victim's condition (punishable by 3, 6, or 8 years' imprisonment); 16. with a victim who submits under the belief that the person committing the act is someone known to the victim other than the accused, and this belief is induced by any artifice, pretense, or concealment practiced by the accused, with intent to induce the belief (punishable by 3, 6, or 8 years' imprisonment); or; 17. with a victim where the act is accomplished by threatening to use the authority of a public official to incarcerate, arrest, or deport the victim or another and the victim has a reasonable belief that the perpetrator is a public official (punishable by 3, 6, or 8 years).)
Oral copulation	Cal. Penal Code § 288a	Depends from the circumstances (Note: Victim: 1. who is under the age of 18 (punishable by up to 1 year's imprisonment); 2. who is under 16 years of age and the offender is over 21 years of age (punishable as a felony); 3. who is under 14 years of age and more than 10 years younger than the offender (punishable by imprisonment of 3, 6, or 8 years); 4. where the act is accomplished against the victim's will by means of force, violence, duress, menace, or fear of immediate and unlawful bodily injury on the victim or another person (punishable by 3, 6, or 8 years' imprisonment); 5. who is under 14 years of age and the act is accomplished against the victim's will by means of force, violence, duress, menace, or fear of immediate and unlawful bodily injury on the victim or another person (punishable by 8, 10, or 12 years' imprisonment); 6. who is a minor older than 14 years of age and the act is accomplished against the victim's will by means of force, violence, duress, menace, or fear of immediate and unlawful bodily injury on the victim or another person (punishable by 6, 8, or 10, years’ imprisonment); 7. where the act is accomplished against the victim's will by threatening to retaliate in the future against the victim or any other person and there is a reasonable possibility that the perpetrator will execute the threat (punishable by 3, 6, or 8 years' imprisonment); 8. while acting in concert with another person, either personally or by aiding and abetting the other person and : (1) the act is accomplished against the victim's will by means of force or fear of immediate and unlawful bodily injury on the victim or another person; or (2) the act is accomplished against the victim's will by threatening to retaliate in the future against the victim or any other person and there is a reasonable possibility that the perpetrator will execute the threat; or (3) the victim is at the time incapable of consenting because of a mental disorder or disability and the offender knew or reasonably should have known (punishable by 5, 7, or 9 years' imprisonment); 9. while acting in concert with another person, either personally or aiding and abetting the other person, and the victim is under 14 years of age and the act is accomplished against the victim's will by means of force or fear of immediate and unlawful bodily injury on the victim or another person (punishable by 10, 12, or 14 years' imprisonment); 10. while acting in concert with another person, either personally or aiding and abetting the other person and the victim is a minor over 14 years of age and the act is accomplished against the victim's will by means of force or fear of immediate and unlawful bodily injury on the victim or another person (punishable by 8, 10, or 12 years' imprisonment); 11. who is confined in a prison at the time (punishable by not more than 1 year's imprisonment); 12. who is unconscious of the nature of the act (incapable of resisting because they are asleep or unconscious; not aware, knowing, perceiving, or cognizant of the act; not aware or cognizant of the essential characteristics of the act due to the perpetrator's fraud in fact; or not aware or cognizant of the essential characteristics of the act due to the perpetrator's fraudulent representation that the sexual penetration served a professional purpose when it did not), and this is known to the offender (punishable by 3, 6, or 8 years' imprisonment); 13. who is incapable of consenting because of mental disorder or disability, and the offender knew or reasonably should have known (punishable by 3, 6, or 8 years' imprisonment); 14. who is incapable of consenting because of mental disorder or disability, and the offender knew or reasonably should have known but both the victim and offender are institutionalized for treatment of mental disorders (punishable by up to 1 year's imprisonment); 15. who is prevented from resisting because of a substance and the offender knew or should have known (punishable by 3, 6, or 8 years); 16. who submits under the belief that the offender is someone known to the victim other than the accused, and this belief is induced by any artifice, pretense, or concealment practiced by the accused, with intent to induce the belief(punishable by 3, 6, or 8 years' imprisonment); or; 17. where the act is accomplished against the victim's will by threatening to use the authority of a public official to incarcerate, arrest, or deport the victim or another and the victim has a reasonable belief that the perpetrator is a public official (punishable by 3, 6, or 8 years' imprisonment).)
Forcible Acts of Sexual Penetration	Cal. Penal Code § 289	Depends from the circumstances (Note: When: 1. against a victim's will by means of force, violence, duress, menace, or fear of immediate and unlawful bodily injury on the victim or another person (punishable by 3, 6, or 8 years' imprisonment); 2. upon a child who is under 14 years old and the act is accomplished by means of force, violence, duress, menace, or fear of immediate and unlawful bodily injury on the victim or another person (punishable by 8,10, or 12 years' imprisonment); 3. upon a minor who is over 14 years old and the act is accomplished by means of force, violence, duress, menace, or fear of immediate and unlawful bodily injury on the victim or another person (punishable by 6, 8, or 10 years' imprisonment); 4. against the victim's will by threatening to retaliate in the future against the victim or any other person and there is a reasonable possibility that the perpetrator will execute the threat (punishable by 3, 6, or 8 years' imprisonment); 5. where the victim is incapable of consenting because of mental disorder or disability and the offender knew or should have known that the victim was unable to consent (punishable by 3, 6, or 8 years' imprisonment); 6. where the victim is incapable of consenting because of mental disorder or disability and the offender knew or should have known that the victim was unable to consent BUT at the time both the victim and offender were institutionalized for treatment for mental disorders (punishable by not more than one year's imprisonment); or; 7. with a victim who is unconscious of the nature of the act (incapable of resisting because they are asleep or unconscious; not aware, knowing, perceiving, or cognizant of the act; not aware or cognizant of the essential characteristics of the act due to the perpetrator's fraud in fact; or not aware or cognizant of the essential characteristics of the act due to the perpetrator's fraudulent representation that the sexual penetration served a professional purpose when it did not) (punishable by 3, 6, or 8 years' imprisonment); 8. with a victim who is prevented from resisting by a substance and the offender knew or should have known the victim's condition (punishable by 3, 6, or 8 years' imprisonment); 9. with a victim who submits under the belief that the person committing the act or causing the act to be committed is someone known to the victim other than the accused, and this belief is induced by any artifice, pretense, or concealment practiced by the accused, with intent to induce the belief (punishable by 3, 6, or, 8 years' imprisonment); 10. against a victim's will by threatening to use the authority of a public official to incarcerate, arrest, or deport the victim or another, and the victim has a reasonable belief that the perpetrator is a public official (punishable by 3, 6, or 8 years); 11. with another person who is under 18 years of age (punishable by less than 1 year's imprisonment); 12. with a victim under the age of 16 and the offender is above the age of 21 (punishable as a felony); 13. with a victim who is under the age of 14 and the offender is more than 10 years older (punishable by 3, 6, or 8 years' imprisonment))

All crimes listed here are also subject to California’s “One-Strike Law,” outlined in Penal Code 667.61. This law includes a list of aggravating circumstances—such as having a prior sex crime conviction or employing torture during the crime. If one or more aggravating circumstances are found to be true, the base sentence can be increased to a life sentence. Parole eligibility depends on the age of the victim and the number of aggravating circumstances that are proven. Depending on the specifics of the case, parole eligibility may be set at 15 years served, 25 years served, or, in extreme cases, life without the possibility of parole. As of October 2021, the spousal rape section was repealed by the Legislature. Spousal rape is now prosecuted the same as other rape charges.

=== Colorado ===
Sexual assault describes rape in the law of Colorado, and several factors make this crime, normally classified as class 3 felony, to be punished more harshly.

Offense	Article	Mandatory sentencing
Sexual assault	Colo. Rev. Stat. §18-3-402(2)	Between 2 and 6 years, followed by 3 years of parole
Sexual assault when violence is threatened or used or when victim drugged	Colo. Rev. Stat. §18-3-402(3.5)	Between 4 and 12 years, followed by 5 years of parole
Sexual assault when victim suffers serious bodily injury or when offender armed or assisted by others	Colo. Rev. Stat. §18-3-402(5)	Between 8 and 24 years, followed by 5 years of parole

=== Connecticut ===
Offense	Article	Mandatory sentencing
Sexual assault in the first degree	Conn. Gen. Stat. Ann. §53a-70	Between 1 and 20 years
Aggravated sexual assault in the first degree	Conn. Gen. Stat. Ann. §53a-70a	At least 10 years
Aggravated sexual assault in the first degree when victim under 16	Conn. Gen. Stat. Ann. §53a-70a	At least 10 years
Sexual assault in the second degree	Conn. Gen. Stat. Ann. §53a-71	Between 1 and 10 years
Sexual assault in the second degree when victim under 16	Conn. Gen. Stat. Ann. §53a-71	Between 1 and 20 years
Sexual assault in the third degree	Conn. Gen. Stat. Ann. §53a-72a	Between 1 and 5 years
Sexual assault in the third degree when victim under 16	Conn. Gen. Stat. Ann. §53a-72a	Between 1 and 10 years

=== Delaware ===
In Delaware, rape is divided in four degrees.

Offense	Article	Mandatory sentencing
Rape in the fourth degree	Del. Code Ann. tit. 11, § 770	Up to 15 years
Rape in the third degree	Del. Code Ann. tit. 11, § 771	Between 2 and 25 years
Rape in the second degree	Del. Code Ann. tit. 11, § 772	Between 10 and 25 years
Rape in the first degree	Del. Code Ann. tit. 11, § 773	15 years to life-with-or-without-parole; Mandatory life-without-parole if: The victim is under 16; The victim becomes disabled due to the rape; The defendant has previously been convicted of first- or second-degree rape; There were three or more separate victims

=== Florida ===
In Florida, rape is denominated "sexual battery." Of note, the offense of capital sexual battery cover cases where the offender is above 18 and the victim below 12.

Offense	Article	Mandatory sentencing
Statutory sexual battery	Fla. Stat. § 794.011(8)(a)	Up to 5 years
Sexual battery	Fla. Stat. §§ 794.011(2)(b), 794.011(5)(b), 794.011(5)(c)	Up to 15 years
Aggravated sexual battery	Fla. Stat. §§ 794.011(2)(b), 794.011(3), 794.011(2)(b)	Life without parole (For juveniles, a judge will set a maximum sentence of 40 years and they are eligible for review after serving 5/8 of that sentence)
Capital sexual battery	Fla. Stat. § 794.011(2)(a)	Death (Note: Death penalty banned for non-fatal rapes as per Kennedy v. Louisiana.) or Life without parole (For juveniles, a judge will set a maximum sentence of 40 years and they are eligible for review after serving 5/8 of that sentence)
Sodomy	Fla. Stat. § 800.02	Up to 60 days

Section 794.011 of the Florida Statutes defines "consent" as 'intelligent, knowing, and voluntary consent and does not include coerced submission. "Consent" shall not be deemed or construed to mean the failure by the alleged victim to offer physical resistance to the offender.' Any sexual act performed on a person without their freely given or affirmative consent is punishable as 'sexual battery' to various degrees (depending on the perpetrator's and victim's ages, and whether no, some, or potentially deadly physical force or coercion was used).

=== Georgia ===
In Georgia, the offense of rape is consolidated in only one offense, and a separate charge of sodomy has been defined.

Offense	Article	Mandatory sentencing
Rape	Ga. Code Ann. § 16-6-1	Death, LWOP, life with parole, or any sentence not less than 25 years followed by lifetime probation
Aggravated sodomy	Ga. Code Ann. § 16-6-2(a)(2)	Life or any term not less than 25 years followed by life probation
Statutory rape	Ga. Code Ann. § 16-6-3	If offender above 21 then between 10 and 20 years; If victim between 14 and 16 and offender below 18 and no more than four years older than the victim then it is a misdemeanor; Else, between 1 and 20 years

=== Hawaii ===
In Hawaii, the offense of sexual assault has been divided in three degrees.

Offense	Article	Mandatory sentencing
Sexual assault in the first degree	Haw. Rev. Stat. § 707-730	Up to 20 years
Sexual assault in the second degree	Haw. Rev. Stat. § 707-731	Up to 10 years
Sexual assault in the third degree	Haw. Rev. Stat. § 707-732	Up to 5 years

=== Idaho ===
Idaho defines, besides classical rape, marital rape.

Offense	Article	Mandatory Sentencing
Rape	Idaho Code Ann. § 18-6101	Any term of years greater than 1, or life
Rape of spouse	Idaho Code Ann. § 18-6107	Life or not less than 1 year
Infamous crime against nature	Idaho Code Ann. § 18-6605	Any term of years greater than five, or life

=== Illinois ===
In Illinois, the term of "criminal sexual assault" is used to describe what would be termed rape in the usual language.

Offense	Article	Mandatory sentencing
Criminal Sexual Assault	720 ILCS 5/11-1.20	Between 4 and 15 years (Note: Cases: 1. A defendant convicted of criminal sexual assault under (1) or (2), and was previously convicted of criminal sexual assault or exploitation of a child, or an offense either in Illinois or another state that is substantially equivalent, commits a Class X felony, punishable by a term of imprisonment of not less than 30 years and not more than 60 years, except that if defendant is under the age of 18 at the time of the offense, defendant shall be sentenced under Section 5-4.5-105 of the U.S. Code of Corrections.; 2. A defendant who has attained the age of 18 at the time of the commission of the offense and who is convicted of criminal sexual assault under (1) or (2), and was previously convicted of aggravated criminal sexual assault or predatory criminal sexual assault of a child, of a child, or an offense either in Illinois or another state that is substantially equivalent, shall be sentenced to a term of natural life imprisonment. A person who is under the age of 18 at the time of commission of the offense shall be sentenced under Section 5-4.5-105 of the Unified Code of Corrections.; 3. A second or subsequent conviction under (3) or (4), or under any similar statute of Illinois or another state, is a Class X felony.)
Aggravated Criminal Sexual Assault	720 ILCS 5/11-1.30	Between 6 and 30 years (Note: Cases: 1. A defendant convicted under (A)(2) – (7), (B), or (C) commits a Class X felony.; 2. A defendant convicted under (A)(1) commits a Class X felony for which 10 years shall be added to the term of imprisonment imposed by the court.; 3. A defendant convicted under (A)(8) commits a Class X felony for which 15 years shall be added to the term of imprisonment imposed by the court.; 4. A defendant convicted under (A)(9) commits a Class X felony for which 20 years shall be added to the term of imprisonment imposed by the court.; 5. A defendant convicted under (A)(10) commits a Class X felony for which 25 years or up to a term of natural life imprisonment shall be added to the term of imprisonment imposed by the court.; 6. A defendant under the age of 18 at the time of the commission of an offense for which defendant is convicted under (A)(1) – (A)(10) shall be sentenced under Section 5-4.5-105 of the Unified Code of Corrections.; 7. A defendant who has attained the age of 18 at the time of the commission of the offense and who is convicted of a second or subsequent conviction for this offense, or a previous conviction for criminal sexual assault, predatory criminal sexual assault of a child, or an offense either in Illinois or another state that is substantially equivalent, will result in a sentence of a term of natural life imprisonment. A person who is under the age of 18 at the time of commission of the offense shall be sentenced under Section 5-4.5-105 of the Unified Code of Corrections.)
Predatory Criminal Sexual Assault of a Child	720 ILCS 5/11-1.40	Between 6 and 30 years (Note: Cases: 1. A defendant convicted under (1) commits a Class X felony, for which defendant shall be sentenced to a term of imprisonment of not less than 6 years and not more than 60 years.; 2. A defendant convicted under (2)(a) commits a Class X felony for which 15 years shall be added to the term of imprisonment imposed by the court.; 3. A defendant convicted under (2)(b) commits a Class X felony for which 20 years shall be added to the term of imprisonment imposed by the court.; 4. A defendant who has attained the age of 18 and who is convicted under (2)(c) commits a Class X felony for which defendant shall be sentenced to a term of imprisonment of not less than 50 years or up to a term of natural life imprisonment.; 5. A defendant who is convicted under (1), (2)(a), (2)(b) or (2)(c) and who is under the age of 18 at the time of commission of the offense shall be sentenced under Section 5-4.5-105 of the Unified Code of Corrections.; 6. A defendant convicted under (2)(d) commits a Class X felony for which defendant shall be sentenced to a term of imprisonment of not less than 50 years and not more than 60 years. A defendant who is under the age of 18 at the time of commission of the offense, however, shall be sentenced under Section 5-4.5-105 of the Unified Code of Corrections.; 7. A defendant who has attained the age of 18 at the time of commission of the offense and is convicted of an offense committed against 2 or more persons, regardless of whether the offenses occurred as a result of the same act or of several related or unrelated acts, shall be sentenced to a term of natural life imprisonment. A defendant who is under the age of 18 at the time of commission of the offense shall be sentenced under Section 5-4.5-105 of the Unified Code of Corrections.; 8. If defendant is eighteen years old or older, a second or subsequent conviction for this offense, or a previous conviction for criminal sexual assault, aggravated criminal sexual assault, or an offense either in Illinois or another state that is substantially equivalent, will result in a sentence of a term of natural life imprisonment. A defendant who is under the age of 18 at the time of commission of the offense shall be sentenced under Section 5-4.5-105 of the Unified Code of Corrections.)

According to the 2012 Criminal Code of the Illinois Compiled Statutes, 720 ILCS 5/11-1.70, "consent" is 'a freely given agreement to the act of sexual penetration or sexual conduct in question. Lack of verbal or physical resistance or submission by the victim resulting from the use of force or threat of force by the accused shall not constitute consent. The manner of dress of the victim at the time of the offense shall not constitute consent. A person who initially consents to sexual penetration or sexual conduct is not deemed to have consented to any sexual penetration or sexual conduct that occurs after he or she withdraws consent during the course of that sexual penetration or sexual conduct.' However, the lack of consent is not sufficient to prosecute anyone for a sex crime (except in very specific cases in which the victim is deemed incapable of consenting, namely Section 11-1.20 (a)(2), Section 11-1.50.(a)(2), Section 11-9.2.(e), and Section 11-9.5.(c)), making Illinois' rape legislation coercion-based (Section 11-1.20 (a)(1)).

=== Indiana ===
In Indiana, there is only one separate disposition for the crime of rape, on which, if needed, are applied aggravating circumstances.

Offense	Article	Mandatory sentencing
Rape	Ind. Code § 35-42-4-1	Between 3 and 16 years
Aggravated rape	Ind. Code § 35-42-4-1(b)	Between 20 and 40 years
Child Seduction with sexual intercourse	Ind. Code § 35-42-4-7(q)(2)	Between 1 and 6 years

=== Iowa ===
In Iowa, there are three degrees of rape.

Offense	Article	Mandatory sentencing
Sexual Abuse in the First Degree	Iowa Code § 709.2	Life without parole (parole eligibility if the defendant was a juvenile)
Sexual Abuse in the Second Degree	Iowa Code § 709.3	Up to 25 years
Sexual Abuse in the Third Degree	Iowa Code § 709.4	Up to 10 years

=== Kansas ===
In addition to the different categories of statutory rape, there is one category of rape in Kansas.

Offense	Article	Mandatory sentencing
Rape	KAN. STAT. ANN. § 21-5503	Variable (Note: Cases: 1. Non-consensual intercourse by force or force or with a victim that is unconscious or physically powerless is a severity level 1, person felony; 2. Sexual intercourse with a child under 14 is a severity level 1, person felony; 3. Sexual intercourse through the two types of knowing misrepresentation listed above is a severity level 2, person felony)
Indecent Liberties with a Child	KAN. STAT. ANN. 21-5506(a)	Severity level 5, person felony
Aggravated Indecent Liberties with a Child	KAN. STAT. ANN. §§ 21-5503 et sequential	Variable (Note: Cases: 1. Sexual intercourse with a child between 14 and 16 is a severity level 3, person felony; 2. Engaging in the listed lewd acts with a child 14–16 years old is a severity level 4, person felony; 3. Engaging in the listed lewd acts with a child younger than 14 is a severity level 3, person felony)
Criminal Sodomy	KAN. STAT. ANN. § 21-5504	Variable (Note: Cases: 1. Sodomy between two people who are over 16 years of age or between a person and an animal is a class B, nonperson misdemeanor.; 2. Sodomy with a 14–16 year old or forcing a 14–16 year old to have sodomy is a severity level 3, person felony.; 3. Sodomy with a non-consenting victim or forcing someone to engage in sodomy is a severity level 1, person felony.; 4. Sodomy with a child under 14 or with a victim who does not consent to sodomy but is overcome by fear or force, is unconscious or physically powerless, or is incapable of giving consent is a severity level 1, person felony)
Aggravated Criminal Sodomy	KAN. STAT. ANN. § 21-5504	Variable

=== Kentucky ===
The law in Kentucky separates rape and sodomy, both divided into three degrees.

Offense	Article	Mandatory sentencing
Rape in the First Degree	KY. REV. STAT. ANN. § 510.040	Between 10 and 20 years
Aggravated Rape in the First Degree	KY. REV. STAT. ANN. § 510.040	Life or between 20 and 50 years
Rape in the Second Degree	KY. REV. STAT. ANN. § 510.050	Between 5 and 10 years
Rape in the Third Degree	KY. REV. STAT. ANN. § 510.060	Between 1 and 5 years
Sodomy in the First Degree	KY. REV. STAT. ANN. § 510.070	Between 10 and 20 years
Aggravated Sodomy in the First Degree	KY. REV. STAT. ANN. § 510.070	Life or between 20 and 50 years
Sodomy in the Second Degree	KY. REV. STAT. ANN. § 510.080	Between 5 and 10 years
Sodomy in the Third Degree	KY. REV. STAT. ANN. § 510.090	Between 1 and 5 years

=== Louisiana ===
Louisiana has divided the offense of rape into three degrees.

Its capital child rape status was overturned by the Supreme Court in Kennedy v. Louisiana.

Offense	Article	Mandatory sentencing
First Degree Rape	LA. REV. STAT. ANN. § 14:42	Life without parole (eligible for parole after 30 years if the defendant was under 18)
First Degree Rape on child under 13	LA. REV. STAT. ANN. § 14:42 D. (2)(a)	Death or life without parole (eligible for parole after 30 years if the defendant was under 18)
Second Degree Rape	LA. REV. STAT. ANN. § 14:42.1	Between 5 and 40 years
Third Degree Rape	LA. REV. STAT. ANN. § 14:43	Up to 25 years

=== Maine ===
In Maine, rape is denominated "Gross Sexual Assault."

Offense	Article	Mandatory sentencing
Gross Sexual Assault	ME. REV. STAT. tit. 17A, § 253	Variable (Note: Cases: 1. Compelling sexual acts is a class A crime.; 2. A sexual act with someone under 14 is a class A crime.; 3. A sexual act with someone under 12 is a class A crime.; 4. A sexual act with someone who the offender has in some way intoxicated is a class B crime.; 5. A sexual act by threat is a class B crime.; 6. A sexual act with a person with mental disability is a class B crime.; 7. A sexual act with someone who is unconscious or is otherwise unable to physically resist is a class B crime.; 8. A sexual act, as described above, by a person in an authoritative or disciplinary capacity is a class C crime.; 9. A sexual act with a student under 18 when the offender has an instructional, supervisory, or disciplinary authority over the victim is a class C crime.; 10. A sexual act with a minor by someone in charge of the long-term care and welfare of that person is a class B crime.; 11. A sexual act by a psychiatrist, psychologist, or social worker with a client is a class C crime.; 12. A sexual act by an owner, operator, or employee of an organization licensed by the Department of Health and Human Services on a client of that organization is a class C crime.; 13. A sexual act on a dependent person who is unable to provide self-care is a class C crime.)

=== Maryland ===
In Maryland, rape, divided into two degrees, is restricted to non-consented vaginal penetration while sexual offenses, divided in four degrees, include sexual acts in the two first degrees, here defined by any forced penetration.

Offense	Article	Mandatory sentencing
Rape in the First Degree	Md. Code Ann., Criminal Law § 3-303	Life without parole or any other term (only an option if the defendant was under 18)
Rape in the Second Degree	Md. Code Ann., Criminal Law § 3-304	Up to 20 years
Aggravated Rape in the Second Degree	Md. Code Ann., Criminal Law § 3-304(c)(2)	Life or any term not less than 15 years
Sexual Offense in the First Degree	Md. Code Ann., Criminal Law § 3-305	Life or any other term
Aggravated Sexual Offense in the First Degree	Md. Code Ann., Criminal Law § 3-305(d)(2)-(4)	Life without parole or any other term (only an option if the defendant was under 18)
Sexual Offense in the Second Degree	Md. Code Ann., Criminal Law § 3-306	Up to 20 years
Aggravated Sexual Offense in the Second Degree	Md. Code Ann., Criminal Law § 3-306(c)(2)	Life or any term not less than 15 years

=== Massachusetts ===
Several different statutes define rape in Massachusetts.

Offense	Article	Mandatory sentencing
Rape	MASS. GEN. LAWS. ANN. ch. 265, § 22	Life or any other term (Note: Cases: 1. If rape results in or is committed along with acts resulting in serious bodily injury, is committed by a joint enterprise, or is committed during the commission or attempted commission of certain dangerous felonies, it is punishable by life imprisonment or any term of years.; 2. Rape without one of the above factors is punishable by state imprisonment not more than 20 years. Repeat offenders shall be punished up to life imprisonment.; 3. Committing rape while armed with a firearm or assault weapon is punishable by at least 10 years in state prison. Whoever commits a second or subsequent such offense shall be punished by imprisonment in the state prison for life or for any term of years, but not less than 15 years.)
Rape of a Child	MASS. GEN. LAWS. ANN. ch. 265, § 22A	Life or any other term
Rape of a Child During Commission of Certain Offenses	MASS. GEN. LAWS. ANN. ch. 265, § 22B	Life or any term not less than 15 years
Rape of a Child by Previously Convicted Offenders	MASS. GEN. LAWS. ANN. ch. 265, § 22C	Life or any term not less than 20 years
Statutory Rape	MASS. GEN. LAWS. ANN. ch. 265, § 23	Life or any other term
Aggravated Statutory Rape of a Child	MASS. GEN. LAWS. ANN. ch. 265, § 23A	Life or any term not less than 10 years
Statutory Rape of a Child by Previously Convicted Offenders	MASS. GEN. LAWS. ANN. ch. 265, § 23B	Life or any term not less than 15 years
Crime against nature	MASS. GEN. LAWS. ANN. ch. 272, § 34	Up to 20 years

=== Michigan ===
In Michigan, the offense of rape is contained into the offenses of Criminal Sexual Conduct.

Offense	Article	Mandatory sentencing
Crime against nature	MICH. COMP. LAWS ANN. § 750.158	Life or any other term
Criminal Sexual Conduct in the First Degree	MICH. COMP. LAWS ANN. § 750.520b	Life or any other term
Criminal Sexual Conduct in the Second Degree	MICH. COMP. LAWS ANN. § 750.520c	Up to 15 years
Criminal Sexual Conduct in the Third Degree	MICH. COMP. LAWS ANN. § 750.520d	Up to 15 years
Criminal Sexual Conduct in the Fourth Degree	MICH. COMP. LAWS ANN. § 750.520e	Up to 2 years

=== Minnesota ===
In Minnesota the offense is divided into five degrees, of which the first three cover rape.

Offense	Article	Mandatory sentencing
Criminal Sexual Conduct in the First Degree	Minn. Stat. § 609.342	Up to 30 years
Criminal Sexual Conduct in the Second Degree	Minn. Stat. § 609.343	Up to 25 years
Criminal Sexual Conduct in the Third Degree	Minn. Stat. § 609.344	Up to 15 years

Until July 2019, in Minnesota sexual violence occurring between spouses at the time they cohabit or between unmarried partners could be prosecuted only if there was force or threat of thereof, due to exemptions created by Article 609.349 'Voluntary relationships' which stipulated that certain sexual offenses do not apply to spouses (unless they are separated), and neither do they apply to unmarried cohabitants. These are offenses that deal with situations where the lack of consent is due to the incapacity of consent of the victim, including where the victim was drugged by the perpetrator. These situations, which were excluded from prosecution, are where the victim was "mentally impaired, mentally incapacitated, or physically helpless". The term "mentally incapacitated" is defined as a person who "under the influence of alcohol, a narcotic, anesthetic, or any other substance, administered to that person without the person's agreement, lacks the judgment to give a reasoned consent to sexual contact or sexual penetration". (see Article 609.341 for definitions). In 2019, these exemptions were repealed.

In 2021 the Minnesota Supreme Court ruled that people who drink alcohol or take drugs of their own free will before being sexually assaulted do not meet the Minnesota legislature’s definition of mentally incapacitated.

=== Mississippi ===
Several disparate statutes are applicable to the crime of rape.

Offense	Article	Mandatory sentencing
Rape by drugging	Miss. Code Ann. § 97-3-65(4)	Life or any other term
Rape or Assault with Intent to Ravish	Miss. Code Ann. § 97-3-71	Life or any other term
Sexual Battery	Miss. Code Ann. § 97-3-95	Up to 20 years (Note: For a first conviction.)
Statutory Rape	Miss. Code Ann. § 97-3-65	Life or any other term (Note: Depending from the victim's age.)
Unnatural Intercourse	Miss. Code Ann. § 97-29-59	Up to 10 years

=== Missouri ===
In Missouri, both rape and statutory rape, along with sodomy, are divided into two degrees.

Offense	Article	Mandatory sentencing
First Degree Rape	Mo. Rev. Stat. § 566.030	Life or any term not less than 5 years
Second Degree Rape	Mo. Rev. Stat. § 566.031	Up to 7 years
Statutory Rape in the First Degree	Mo. Rev. Stat. § 566.032	Life or any sentence not less than 5 years
Statutory Rape in the Second Degree	Mo. Rev. Stat. § 566.034	Up to 7 years
Sodomy in the First Degree	Mo. Rev. Stat. § 566.060	Life or any term not less than 5 years
Sodomy in the Second Degree	Mo. Rev. Stat. § 566.061	Up to 7 years

=== Montana ===
In Montana rape is denominated Sexual Intercourse Without Consent.

Offense	Article	Mandatory sentencing
Sexual Intercourse Without Consent	Mont. Code Anno. § 45-5-503	Life or between 2 and 100 years
Second conviction for sexual intercourse without consent when both accompanied by serious bodily injury	Mont. Code Anno. § 45-5-503(3)(c)	Death or Life without parole (eligible for parole after 30 years if the defendant was under 18)

=== Nebraska ===
In Nebraska the first degrees of several sex offenses cover cases of rape.

Offense	Article	Mandatory sentencing
Sexual Assault in the First Degree	R.R.S. Neb. § 28-319	Between 1 and 50 years
Sexual Assault of a Child in the First Degree	R.S.S. Neb. § 28-319.01	Life or any term not less than 20 years
Sexual Assault of an Inmate or Parolee in the First Degree	R.R.S. Neb. § 28-322	Up to 20 years

=== Nevada ===
In Nevada, the offense of rape is denominated Sexual Assault.

Offense	Article	Mandatory sentencing
Sexual Assault	Nev. Rev. Stat. Ann. § 200.366	Life with a minimum of 10 years
Sexual Assault causing substantial bodily harm	Nev. Rev. Stat. Ann. § 200.366(2)(a)	Life without parole or life with a minimum of 15 years (only an option if the defendant was a juvenile)
Sexual Assault when the victim is under the age of 16	Nev. Rev. Stat. Ann. § 200.366(3)(a)	Life with a minimum of 25 years
Sexual Assault causing substantial bodily harm when the victim is under the age of 16	Nev. Rev. Stat. Ann. § 200.366(3)(b)	Life without parole (eligible for parole after 35 years if the defendant was under 18)
Sexual Assault when the victim is under the age of 14	Nev. Rev. Stat. Ann. § 200.366(3)(c)	Life with a minimum of 35 years
Statutory Sexual Seduction when offender above 21	Nev. Rev. Stat. Ann. § 200.368(1)	Between 1 and 10 years
Statutory Sexual Seduction when offender under 21	Nev. Rev. Stat. Ann. § 200.368(2)	Up to 364 days

=== New Hampshire ===
In New Hampshire, rape is denominated Sexual Assault.

Offense	Article	Mandatory sentencing
Aggravated Felonious Sexual Assault	RSA 632-A:2	Between 10 and 20 years
Felonious Sexual Assault	RSA 632-A:3	Between 1 and 7 years
Sexual Assault	RSA 632-A:4	Up to 1 year

=== New Jersey ===
In New Jersey, rape is covered as Aggravated Sexual Assault in the First Degree.

Offense	Article	Mandatory sentencing
Aggravated Sexual Assault in the First Degree	N.J.S.A. 2C:14-2(a)	Life with at least 25 years served or a term of 25 years and less

=== New Mexico ===
In New Mexico the offense of rape is punished as Criminal Sexual Penetration, itself divided in four degrees.

Offense	Article	Mandatory sentencing
Criminal Sexual Penetration in the First Degree	N.M. Stat. Ann. § 30-9-11(D)	18 years
Criminal Sexual Penetration in the Second Degree	N.M. Stat. Ann. § 30-9-11(E)	15 years
Criminal Sexual Penetration in the Third Degree	N.M. Stat. Ann. § 30-9-11(F)	3 years
Criminal Sexual Penetration in the Fourth Degree	N.M. Stat. Ann. § 30-9-11(G)	18 months

=== New York ===
In New York the crime of rape and Criminal Sexual Act are divided in three degrees; moreover, the offense of "Sexual Misconduct" describes any sexual act done without the victim's consent.

Offense	Article	Mandatory sentencing
Sexual Misconduct	N.Y. Penal Law § 130.20	Up to 364 days
Rape in the Third Degree	N.Y. Penal Law § 130.25	Up to 4 years
Rape in the Second Degree	N.Y. Penal Law § 130.30	Between 2 and 7 years
Rape in the First Degree	N.Y. Penal Law § 130.35	Between 5 and 25 years
Criminal Sexual Act in the Third Degree	N.Y. Penal Law § 130.40	Up to 4 years
Criminal Sexual Act in the Second Degree	N.Y. Penal Law § 130.45	Between 2 and 7 years
Criminal Sexual Act in the First Degree	N.Y. Penal Law § 130.50	Between 5 and 25 years
Aggravated Sexual Abuse in the Fourth Degree	N.Y. Penal Law § 130.65-a	Up to 4 years
Aggravated Sexual Abuse in the Third Degree	N.Y. Penal Law § 130.66	Between 2 and 7 years
Aggravated Sexual Abuse in the Second Degree	N.Y. Penal Law § 130.67	Between 3.5 and 15 years
Aggravated Sexual Abuse in the First Degree	N.Y. Penal Law § 130.70	Between 5 and 15 years

Sexual offenses are defined as 'sexual [acts] committed without consent of the victim'. Lack of consent results from 4 possible causes: forcible compulsion, incapacity to consent, the victim not expressly or implicitly acquiescing (in sexual abuse and forcible touching cases), or expression of lack of consent (in sexual intercourse and sexual oral or anal conduct cases). Consent itself is not defined; Section 130.5 of the New York Penal Law only stipulates that a person who doesn't want to have sex needs to be clear enough in their words and acts, so that 'a reasonable person in the actor's situation would have understood such person's words and acts as an expression of lack of consent to such act under all the circumstances'. This description doesn't make clear whether affirmative consent is required to have sex (or conversely, whether a lack of affirmative consent can result in a sexual offense), but both Section 130.25 Rape in the third degree (3) and Section 130.40 Criminal sexual act in the third degree (3) do provide this possibility in the form of catch-all clauses by stating that, whenever there is a 'lack of consent (...) by reason of some factor other than incapacity to consent', this is sufficient for the sexual act to amount to a crime.

=== North Carolina ===
In North Carolina, the offenses of Rape and Sexual Offense cover cases of forced penetration.

The Constitution of North Carolina ranks rape among the crimes which can be punished by death, although Kennedy v. Louisiana restricts the range of capital crimes to homicides and crimes against the State.

Offense	Article	Mandatory sentencing
First Degree Forcible Rape	N.C. Gen. Stat. Ann. § 14-27.21	LWOP, life with parole or a prison term of at least 12 years (LWP and 12 years are only options if the defendant was under 18)
Second Degree Forcible Rape	N.C. Gen. Stat. Ann. § 14-27.22	From 3 years and 8 months to 15 years and 2 months
Statutory Rape of a Child by an Adult	N.C. Gen. Stat. Ann. § 14-27.23	LWOP, life with parole or a prison term of at least 25 years (LWP and 25 years are only options if the defendant was under 18) After serving his sentence, the convict shall be under lifelong satellite-based monitoring
First Degree Statutory Rape	N.C. Gen. Stat. Ann. § 14-27.24	LWOP, life with parole or a prison term of at least 25 years (LWP and 25 years are only options if the defendant was under 18) After serving his sentence, the convict shall be under lifelong satellite-based monitoring
Statutory Rape of a Person Who Is 15 Years of Age or Younger	N.C. Gen. Stat. Ann. § 14-27.25	LWOP, life with parole or a prison term of at least 12 years (LWP and 12 years are only options if the defendant was under 18)
First Degree Forcible Sexual Offense	N.C. Gen. Stat. Ann. § 14-27.26	LWOP, life with parole or a prison term of at least 12 years (LWP and 12 years are only options if the defendant was under 18)
Second Degree Forcible Sexual Offense	N.C. Gen. Stat. Ann. § 14-27.27	From 3 years and 8 months to 15 years and 2 months
Statutory Sexual Offense of a Child by an Adult	N.C. Gen. Stat. Ann. § 14-27.28	LWOP, life with parole or a prison term of at least 25 years (LWP and 25 years are only options if the defendant was under 18) After serving his sentence, the convict shall be under lifelong satellite-based monitoring
First Degree Statutory Sexual Offense	N.C. Gen. Stat. Ann. § 14-27.29	LWOP, life with parole or a prison term of at least 25 years (LWP and 25 years are only options if the defendant was under 18) After serving his sentence, the convict shall be under lifelong satellite-based monitoring
Statutory Sexual Offense of a Person Who Is 15 Years of Age or Younger	N.C. Gen. Stat. Ann. § 14-27.30	LWOP, life with parole or a prison term of at least 12 years (LWP and 12 years are only options if the defendant was under 18)

=== North Dakota ===
In North Dakota, rape is defined as Gross Sexual Imposition, although several other crimes describe cases of statutory rape.

Offense	Article	Mandatory sentencing
Gross Sexual Imposition when author at least 22 or when the victim suffered serious bodily injury	N.D. Cent. Code Ann. § 12.1-20-03(3)(a)	Life without parole, life or prison term at least 20 years followed with probation (only an option if the defendant was under 18)
Gross Sexual Imposition	N.D. Cent. Code Ann. § 12.1-20-03(3)(b)	Up to 20 years
Gross Sexual Imposition causing death	N.D. Cent. Code Ann. § 12.1-20-03(4)	Life without parole (eligible for parole after 30 years if defendant was under 18)
Continuous Sexual Abuse of a Child when author above 22	N.D. Cent. Code Ann. § 12.1-20-03.1	Life without parole or any other term (only an option if the defendant was under 18)
Continuous Sexual Abuse of a Child when author below 22	N.D. Cent. Code Ann. § 12.1-20-03.1	Up to 20 years
Sexual Imposition	N.D. Cent. Code Ann. § 12.1-20-04	Up to 10 years
Corruption or Solicitation of Minors when victim above 15	N.D. Cent. Code Ann. § 12.1-20-05(1)	Up to 1 year
Corruption or Solicitation of Minors	N.D. Cent. Code Ann. § 12.1-20-05(2)	Up to 5 years
Corruption or Solicitation of Minors when victim above 15 within 50 feet (15.24 meters) of a school	N.D. Cent. Code Ann. § 12.1-20-05(3)	Up to 5 years
Corruption or Solicitation of Minors within 50 feet (15.24 meters) of a school	N.D. Cent. Code Ann. § 12.1-20-05(3)	Up to 10 years
Sexual Abuse of Wards	N.D. Cent. Code Ann. § 12.1-20-06	Up to 5 years

=== Ohio ===
In Ohio, the offenses of Rape and Sexual Battery are relevant to this article.

Offense	Article	Mandatory sentencing
Rape	Ohio Rev. Code Ann. § 2907.02	Between 3 and 11 years
Rape when victim drugged (after March 22, 2019)	Ohio Rev. Code Ann. § 2907.02(A)(1)(a)	Between 5 and 11 years
Rape when victim is under the age of 13	Ohio Rev. Code Ann. § 2907.02(A)(1)(b)	Life with parole eligibility after 10 years
Rape when the victim is under the age 10	Ohio Rev. Code Ann. § 2907.02(A)(1)(b)	Life with parole eligibility after 15 years
Rape if the victim was under the age of 13 and the offender caused serious physical harm; or if the victim was age of 13 and the offender used force or a threat of force	Ohio Rev. Code Ann. § 2907.02(A)(1)(b)	Life with parole eligibility after 25 years or life without parole
Sexual Battery	Ohio Rev. Code Ann. § 2907.03	Between 9 months and 5 years
Sexual Battery when victim under 13	Ohio Rev. Code Ann. § 2907.03	Between 2 and 8 years

=== Oklahoma ===
Oklahoma divides the offense of rape in two degrees and enacted a capital version of the Jessica's Law.

Offense	Article	Mandatory sentencing
Rape in the First Degree	Okla. Stat. Ann. tit. 21, §§ 1114, 1112	Death (if the offense resulted in the fatality), Life without parole, life with parole, or any other term not less than 5 years
Rape in the First Degree with priors	Okla. Stat. Ann. tit. 21, §§ 1114, 1112	Life without parole or life with parole
Rape in the First Degree on victim under 14 after having been previously convicted for sex offenses against children	Okla. Stat. Ann. tit. 21, §§ 1114, 1112	Death or life imprisonment
Okla. Stat. Ann. tit. 21, § 1114; 1112	Okla. Stat. Ann. tit. 21, §§ 1114; 1112	Between 1 and 15 years
Forcible Sodomy	Okla. Stat. Ann. tit. 21, § 888	Up to 20 years
Forcible Sodomy with two priors of sex offenses	Okla. Stat. Ann. tit. 21, § 888	Life without parole or life with parole
Forcible Sodomy of victim under 14 after having been previously convicted for sex offenses against children	Okla. Stat. Ann. tit. 21, § 888	Death or life imprisonment

=== Oregon ===
In Oregon, both rape and sodomy are divided in three degrees, and the crime of Unlawful Sexual Penetration is divided in two degrees.

Offense	Article	Mandatory sentencing
Rape in the Third Degree	Or. Rev. Stat. § 163.355	Up to 5 years
Rape in the Second Degree	Or. Rev. Stat. § 163.365	Between 6 years and 3 months to 10 years
Rape in the First Degree	Or. Rev. Stat. § 163.375	Between 8 years and 4 months to 20 years
Sodomy in the Third Degree	Or. Rev. Stat. § 163.385	Up to 5 years
Sodomy in the Second Degree	Or. Rev. Stat. § 163.395	Between 6 years and 3 months to 10 years
Sodomy in the First Degree	Or. Rev. Stat. § 163.405	Between 8 years and 4 months to 20 years
Unlawful Sexual Penetration in the Second Degree	Or. Rev. Stat. § 163.408	Between 6 years and 3 months to 10 years
Unlawful Sexual Penetration in the First Degree	Or. Rev. Stat. § 163.411	Between 8 years and 4 months to 20 years

=== Pennsylvania ===
In Pennsylvania, the offenses of rape, involuntary deviate sexual intercourse and sexual assault cover what could be commonly called rape.

Offense	Article	Mandatory sentence
Rape	18 Pa. Cons. Stat. § 3121	Up to 20 years (Note: Minimum of 10 years when victim under 16.)
Rape of a child less than 13	18 Pa. Cons. Stat. § 3121(c)	Up to 40 years
Rape of a child less than 13 with serious bodily injury	18 Pa. Cons. Stat. § 3121(d)	Life without parole (eligible for commutation by governor provided there is a unanimous recommendation by the Board of Pardons) or any other term
Involuntary Deviate Sexual Intercourse	18 Pa. Cons. Stat. § 3123	Up to 20 years
Involuntary Deviate Sexual Intercourse of a child less than 13	18 Pa. Cons. Stat. § 3123(c)	Up to 40 years
Involuntary Deviate Sexual Intercourse of a child less than 13 with serious bodily injury	18 Pa. Cons. Stat. § 3123(d)	Life without parole (eligible for commutation by governor provided there is a unanimous recommendation by the Board of Pardons) or any other term
Statutory Sexual Assault in the Second Degree	18 Pa. Cons. Stat. § 3122.1(a)	Up to 10 years
Statutory Sexual Assault in the First Degree	18 Pa. Cons. Stat. § 3122.1(b)	Up to 20 years
Institutional Sexual Assault Sexual Assault by Sports Official, Volunteer, or Employee of Nonprofit Association	18 Pa. Cons. Stat. § 3124.2	Up to 7 years
Aggravated Indecent Assault	18 Pa. Cons. Stat. § 3125(a)	Up to 10 years
Aggravated Indecent Assault of a Child under 13	18 Pa. Cons. Stat. § 3125(b)	Up to 20 years

In the Pennsylvania Consolidated Statutes, 'Section 3107. Resistance not required' stipulates that 'the alleged victim need not resist the actor in prosecutions under this chapter'. The Statutes do not define consent, but if an actor engages in sexual intercourse or deviate sexual intercourse, or aggravated indecent assault, with a complainant without the latter's consent, this makes the actor punishable under 'Section 3124.1. Sexual assault', or 'Section 3125. Aggravated indecent assault', respectively. Furthermore, mental disability can render a person incapable of consenting to sexual intercourse, deviate sexual intercourse, or aggravated indecent assault, thus making an actor who engages in these acts with a mentally disabled complainant punishable under 'Section 3121. Rape', 'Section 3123. Involuntary deviate sexual intercourse', or 'Section 3125. Aggravated indecent assault', respectively.

=== Rhode Island ===
In Rhode Island, the three degrees of Sexual Assault and the first degree of Child Molestation Sexual Assault are relevant to this article.

Offense	Article	Mandatory sentence
Sexual Assault in the First Degree	R.I. Gen. Laws § 11-37-2	Life imprisonment or any term not less than 10 years
Sexual Assault in the Second Degree	R.I. Gen. Laws § 11-37-4	Between 3 and 15 years
Sexual Assault in the Third Degree	R.I. Gen. Laws § 11-37-6	Up to 5 years
First Degree Child Molestation Sexual Assault	R.I. Gen. Laws § 11-37-8.1	Life imprisonment or any term not less than 25 years

=== South Carolina ===
South Carolina divides "criminal sexual conduct" in three degrees, along two categories of teacher-student sex and a special crime for spousal rape.

Offense	Article	Mandatory sentencing
Spousal Sexual Battery	S.C. Code Ann. § 16-3-615	Up to 10 years
Criminal Sexual Conduct in the First Degree	S.C. Code Ann. § 16-3-652	Up to 30 years
Criminal Sexual Conduct in the Second Degree	S.C. Code Ann. § 16-3-653	Up to 20 years
Criminal Sexual Conduct in the Third Degree	S.C. Code Ann. § 16-3-654	Up to 10 years
Felony Sexual Battery with a Student	S.C. Code Ann. §§ 16-3-755(B), 16-3-755(D)	Up to 5 years
Misdemeanor Sexual Battery with a Student	S.C. Code Ann. § 16-3-755(C)	Up to 30 days

=== South Dakota ===
In South Dakota, there are four degrees to the crime of rape.

Offense	Article	Mandatory sentencing
Rape in the First Degree	S.D. Codified Laws § 22-22-1(1)	Life or any term not less than 15 years
Rape in the Second Degree	S.D. Codified Laws § 22-22-1(2)	Up to 50 years
Rape in the Third Degree	S.D. Codified Laws § 22-22-1(3) & (4)	Up to 25 years
Rape in the Fourth Degree	S.D. Codified Laws § 22-22-1(5)	Up to 15 years

=== Tennessee ===
In Tennessee the law distinguishes between Rape and Aggravated Rape, along with some dispositions on statutory rape.

Offense	Article	Mandatory sentencing
Aggravated Rape of a Child	Tenn. Code Ann. § 39-13-531 (a)	Life without parole (after July 1, 2019)
Child Rape	Tenn. Code Ann. § 39-13-531 (b)	Between 25 and 60 years
Aggravated Rape	Tenn. Code Ann. § 39-13-502	Between 15 and 60 years
Rape	Tenn. Code Ann. § 39-13-503	Between 8 and 30 years

=== Texas ===
In Texas, rape is described as Sexual Assault.

Offense	Article	Mandatory sentencing
Sexual Assault	Tex. Penal Code Ann. § 22.011	Between 2 and 20 years
Aggravated Sexual Assault	Tex. Penal Code Ann. § 22.021	Between 5 and 99 years
Cont. Sexual Abuse of Young Children	Tex. Penal Code Ann. § 21.02	Between 25 and 99 years no parole

Section 22.011 (a) defines sexual assault as an actor performing various forms of sexual penetration of another person's body without that person's consent. Section 22.011 (b) implies that a person's consent is always present, except in 12 specified circumstances that render a person incapable of consenting, such as being forced or coerced with violence or threats by the actor (possibly because of the unequal power balance between the actor and the other person), unconscious or 'physically unable to resist', or having a 'mental disease or defect'. Although Subsection (b)(3) and (4) could be interpreted as requiring the other person to resist the sexual assault, in the 2016 Orgain v. State case the Second District Court of Appeals ruled that sexual assault is defined by the attacker's use of force or coercion, not by the victim's resistance. Texas sexual assault law is therefore coercion-based: the actor requires no freely given consent or affirmative consent from the other person, and the other person cannot freely revoke their implied permanent consent, unless they can satisfy one of the 12 specified circumstances. In other words: if the other person claims not to have wanted to have sex with the actor, but cannot be demonstrated to have been incapable of consenting, and the actor cannot be demonstrated to have used some kind of force or coercion, it is not sexual assault under Texas state law.

=== Utah ===
Utah has several laws regarding rape, rape by objects and statutory rape.

Offense	Article	Mandatory sentencing
Unlawful Sexual Activity with a Minor	Utah Code Ann. § 76-5-401	Up to 5 years (Note: 6 months or less if defendant less than four years older than the minor.)
Unlawful Sexual Conduct with a 16-or-17-Year-Old	Utah Code Ann. § 76-5-401.2	Up to 5 years (Note: Penetration or oral sex.)
Rape	Utah Code Ann. § 76-5-402	Life or not less than 5 years
Rape with bodily injuries, or when author already convicted of sex offenses when less than 18-years-old	Utah Code Ann. § 76-5-402	Life or not less than 15 years
Rape when author already convicted of sexual offense as an adult	Utah Code Ann. § 76-5-402	Life without parole
Rape of a Child	Utah Code Ann. §76-5-402.1	Life or not less than 25 years
Rape of a Child when victim seriously harmed or when author already convicted of a sexual offense as an adult	Utah Code Ann. §76-5-402.1	Life without parole

=== Vermont ===
In Vermont, rape is denominated Sexual Assault.

Offense	Article	Mandatory sentencing
Sexual Assault	13 V.S.A. §§ 3252 & 3254	Life or any term not less than 3 years (Note: Less than 20 years when Statutory Rape.)
Aggravated Sexual Assault	13 V.S.A. § 3253	Life or any term not less than 10 years
Aggravated Sexual Assault of a Child	13 V.S.A. § 3253(a)	Life or any term not less than 25 years
Sexual Exploitation of an Inmate	13 V.S.A. § 3257	Up to 5 years
Sexual Exploitation of a Minor	13 V.S.A. § 3258	Up to 1 year (Note: Up to 5 years when victim under offender's authority.)

=== Virginia ===
In Virginia, there is a single offense of Rape along with Forcible Sodomy and various forms of Carnal Knowledge.

Offense	Article	Mandatory sentencing
Rape	Va. Code Ann. § 18.2-61	Life or any term not less than 5 years (Note: Aggravated cases: 1. If the victim is under the age of 13 years and defendant is more than 3 years older than the victim, and the act is done in the commission of, or as part of the same course of conduct as, or as part of a common scheme/plan of any kidnapping, burglary, or assault, then the punishment must include a mandatory minimum term of 25 years; 2. If the victim is under the age of 13 years and defendant was 18 years of age or older at the time of the offense, the punishment must include a mandatory minimum term of life imprisonment without parole.)
Carnal Knowledge of a Child Between 13 and 15 Years of Age	Va. Code Ann. § 18.2-63	Variable (Note: Cases: 1. If defendant is convicted under (A) - victim between 13 and 15 -, then defendant is guilty of a Class 4 felony, imprisonment of not less than two years nor more than 10 years and a fine of not more than $100,000.; 2. If defendant is convicted under (B) - victim between 13 and 15 who consented and the defendant is minor but 3 years senior -, then defendant is guilty of a Class 6 felony, term of imprisonment of not less than one year nor more than five years, or in the discretion of the jury or the court trying the case without a jury, confinement in jail for not more than 12 months and a fine of not more than $2,500, either or both.; 3. If defendant is convicted under (C) - victim between 13 and 15 who consented and the defendant is minor but less than 3 years the child’s senior -, then defendant is guilty of a Class 4 misdemeanor, a term of imprisonment of not less than two years nor more than 10 years and a fine of not more than $100,000.)
Carnal Knowledge of an Inmate, Parolee, Probationer	Va. Code Ann. § 18.2-64.2	Variable (Note: Cases: 1. If defendant is convicted under (A) -prison guard -, then defendant is guilty of a Class 6 felony, term of imprisonment of not less than one year nor more than five years, or in the discretion of the jury or the court trying the case without a jury, confinement in jail for not more than 12 months and a fine of not more than $2,500, either or both; 2. If defendant is convicted under (B) - defendant is a bond bondsman -, then defendant is guilty of a Class 1 misdemeanor, confinement in jail for not more than twelve months and a fine of not more than $2,500, either or both.)
Forcible Sodomy	Va. Code Ann. § 18.2-67.1	Life or any term not less than 5 years

=== Washington ===
Green River College explanation of Washington state law on rape

In Washington, there are three degrees for the offenses of Rape and Rape of a Child, and two degrees for Sexual Misconduct with a Minor.

Offense	Article	Mandatory sentencing
Rape in the First Degree	Wash. Rev. Code § 9a.44.040	Life or any term not less than 3 years
Rape in the Second Degree	Wash. Rev. Code § 9a.44.050	Life or any other term
Rape in the Third Degree	Wash. Rev. Code. § 9A.44.060	Up to 5 years
Rape of a Child in the First Degree	Wash. Rev. Code. § 9A.44.073	Life or any other term
Rape of a Child in the Second Degree	Wash. Rev. Code. § 9A.44.076	Life or any other term
Rape of a Child in the Third Degree	Wash. Rev. Code. § 9A.44.079	Up to 5 years
Sexual Misconduct with a Minor in the First Degree	Wash. Rev. Code. § 9A.44.093	Up to 5 years
Sexual Misconduct with a Minor in the Second Degree	Wash. Rev. Code. § 9A.44.096	Up to 364 days

=== West Virginia ===
In West Virginia, the offense of rape, denominated as "Sexual Assault" and "Sexual Abuse" both divided in three degrees.

Offense	Article	Mandatory sentencing
Sexual Assault in the First Degree	W. Va. Code § 61-8B-3	From 15 years to 35 years (Note: If offender 18 years of age or older and victim is younger than 12 years of age then sentence is from 25 years to 100.)
Sexual Assault in the Second Degree	W. Va. Code § 61-8B-4	From 10 years to 25 years
Sexual Assault in the Third Degree	W. Va. Code § 61-8B-5	From 1 year to 5 years
Sexual Abuse in the First Degree	W. Va. Code § 61-8B-7	From 1 years to 5 years (Note: If offender 18 years of age or older and victim is younger than 12 years of age then sentence is from 5 years to 25 years.)
Sexual Abuse in the Second Degree	W. Va. Code § 61-8B-8	Maximum of 12 months
Sexual Abuse in the Third Degree	W. Va. Code § 61-8B-9	Maximum of 90 days

=== Wisconsin ===
In Wisconsin, main sex offenses, denominated Sexual Assault, are divided in four degrees, and the three first degrees cover cases of penetration.

Additional offenses cover cases of sexual exploitation on vulnerable persons.

Offense	Article	Mandatory sentencing
Sexual Assault in the First Degree	Wis. Stat. § 940.225(1)	Up to 60 years
Sexual Assault in the Second Degree	Wis. Stat. § 940.225(2)	Up to 40 years
Sexual Assault in the Third Degree	Wis. Stat. § 940.225(3)	Up to 10 years
Sexual Assault of a Child in the First Degree	Wis. Stat. § 948.02	Vary (Note: Cases: 1. Whoever has sexual contact or sexual intercourse with a person who has not attained the age of 13 years and causes great bodily harm to the person is guilty of a Class A felony and subject to a 25 year mandatory minimum; 2. Whoever has sexual intercourse with a person who has not attained the age of 12 years is guilty of a Class B felony and subject to a 25 year mandatory minimum; 3. Whoever has sexual intercourse with a person who has not attained the age of 16 years by use of threat of force or violence is guilty of a Class B felony and subject to a 25 year mandatory minimum; 4. Whoever has sexual contact with a person who has not attained the age of 16 years by use or threat of force or violence is guilty of a Class B felony if the actor is at least 18 years of age when the sexual contact occurs and is subject to a 5 year mandatory minimum; 5. Whoever has sexual contact with a person who has not attained the age of 13 years is guilty of a Class B felony.)
Sexual Assault of a Child in the Second Degree	Wis. Stat. § 948.02	Up to 40 years
Sexual Assault of a Child Placed in Substitute Care	Wis. Stat. § 948.085	Up to 40 years
Sexual Assault of a Child by a School Staff Person or Person Who Works or Volunteers with Children	Wis. Stat. § 948.095	Up to 6 years
Sexual Intercourse with a Child Age 16 or Older	Wis. Stat. § 948.09	Up to 9 months

=== Wyoming ===
In Wyoming, rape, denominated there Sexual Assault, is divided in three degrees, and statutory rape, denominated Sexual Abuse of a Minor, is divided in four degrees, the three first involving penetration.

Offense	Article	Mandatory sentencing
Sexual Assault in the First Degree	Wyo. Stat. Ann. § 6-2-302	From 5 to 50 years (Note: Minimum of 25 years for prior offenders, and life without parole when prior conviction for sexual abuse of a minor or when two or more previous convictions for sexual assault or sexual abuse of a minor.)
Sexual Assault in the Second Degree	Wyo. Stat. Ann. § 6-2-303	From 2 to 20 years (Note: Minimum of 25 years and maximum of life for prior offenders, and life without parole when prior conviction for sexual abuse of a minor or when two or more previous convictions for sexual assault or sexual abuse of a minor.)
Sexual Assault in the Third Degree	Wyo. Stat. Ann. § 6-2-304	Up to 10 years
Sexual abuse of a minor in the first degree	Wyo. Stat. Ann. §§ 6-2-314	Up to 50 years (Note: Minimum of 25 years if victim under 13 and criminal over 21.)
Sexual abuse of a minor in the second degree	Wyo. Stat. Ann. §§ 6-2-315	Up to 20 years
Sexual abuse of a minor in the third degree	Wyo. Stat. Ann. §§ 6-2-316	Up to 15 years

== Territory ==
=== American Samoa ===
The laws of American Samoa distinguished between rape, sexual assault, sodomy and deviate sexual assault.

Offense	Article	Mandatory sentencing
Rape	A.S.C.A. 46.3604	5 to 15 years (Note: Sentence of life or any term between 10 and 30 years if the actor inflicts serious physical injury on any person or displays a deadly weapon)
Sexual assault	A.S.C.A. 46.3610	Up to 7 years (Note: 5 to 15 years if the actor inflicts serious physical injury on any person or displays a deadly weapon in a threatening manner.)
Sodomy	A.S.C.A. 46.3611	5 to 15 years
Deviate sexual assault	A.S.C.A. 46.3612	Up to 7 years

=== Guam ===
In Guam, the law distinguishes between four degrees of criminal sexual conduct, the three first involving penetration.

Offense	Article	Mandatory sentencing
First Degree Criminal Sexual Conduct	9 GCA Ch. 25, §25.15	Life without parole, life with parole or at least 15 years
Second Degree Criminal Sexual Conduct	9 GCA Ch. 25, §25.20	5 to 20 years
Third Degree Criminal Sexual Conduct	9 GCA Ch. 25, §25.25	3 to 10 years

=== Northern Mariana Islands ===
In the Commonwealth of the Northern Mariana Islands, the offense of Sexual assault is divided in four degrees, of which the three first involve penetration.

Offense	Article	Mandatory sentencing
Sexual Assault in the First Degree	6 CMC §1301	30 years or less
Sexual Assault in the Second Degree	6 CMC §1302	2 to 15 years
Sexual Assault in the Third Degree	6 CMC §1303	1 to 5 years

=== Puerto Rico ===
In Puerto Rico, there is only the crime of Sexual Assault (Agresión sexual)

Offense	Article	Mandatory sentencing
Sexual Assault (Agresión sexual)	33 L.P.R.A. § 5191	50 years or less

=== Virgin Islands ===
In the American Virgin Islands, the offense of rape is divided in three degrees, and a separate offense of Aggravated rape is further divided in two degrees.

Offense	Article	Mandatory sentencing
Aggravated Rape in the First Degree	14 V.I.C. §1700	Life or sentence of 15 years at least (Note: Life or sentence of 25 years at least for any subsequent offense.)
Aggravated Rape in the Second Degree	14 V.I.C. §1700a	Life or sentence of 10 years at least (Note: Life or sentence of 25 years at least for any subsequent offense.)
Rape in the First Degree	14 V.I.C. §1701	10 to 30 years
Rape in the Second Degree	14 V.I.C. §1702	10 years or less
Rape in the Third Degree	14 V.I.C. §1703	N/A (Note: The perpetrator is subject to the jurisdiction of the Family Division of the Superior Court. In lieu of a term of detention, the court, in its discretion, may recommend appropriate treatment, counseling or family planning.)
