= De Vaux Continental =

Defunct American motor vehicle manufacturer

The Continental De Vaux was an automobile produced by the Continental-De Vaux Company in Grand Rapids, Michigan.

In April 1931, De Vaux-Hall Motors started production of an automobile based on the defunct Durant (automobile). Norman de vaux had been an executive with Durant. The car was called the 6/75 and used a 6-cylinder engine that had been modified by renowned engineer Col. Elbert J. Hall, whose company Hall-Scott Motor Car Company of Berkeley, California, had built engines for airplanes, tractors, buses, and boats, and who helped develop the famed World War I Liberty airplane engine with Packard's Jesse Vincent. The company had two plants - one in Grand Rapids and the other in Oakland, California. Poorly capitalized, after only 4808 cars built the company declared bankruptcy in Michigan court, citing $2 million in assets and $1.8 in liabilities, including $487,000 owed to engine maker Continental Motors Company. Continental purchased the Michigan assets of De Vaux-Hall and later changed the operation's name to Continental-De Vaux Company.

Production of the De Vaux Continental (sometimes called vice-verso) took place during the 1932 model year. The car was basically the De Vaux 6/75 of the previous year, that itself was based on the former 1930 Durant (automobile). It rode on a 113 in. wheelbase and still carried the facelift that Count Alexis de Sakhnoffsky did for the De Vaux in 1931. The Hall-modified Continental 22-A 6-cylinder L-head engine was replaced by a Continental 32-A 6-cylinder L-head with a displacement of 214.7 c.i. (3518 ccm), delivering 84 HP at 3400 rpm. The car now was designated the De Vaux Continental 6/80. Offered were a standard coupe for $725 ($775 with rumble seat), a coupe and a sedan in custom trim for $845 each, and a new custom convertible coupe for $895. Assembly of the vehicles occurred in the former De Vaux-Hall plant in Grand Rapids (which was connected to their body supplier, the Hayes Body Corporation, by a bridge).

Continental brought out its own cars for the 1933 and 1934 model years, not based on the Durant/De Vaux cars, but sold poorly so ceased production.

== De Vaux and De Vaux Continental model comparison ==
Make	Model	Production Run	Engine	Power	Wheelbase	Body Styles
De Vaux	6/75	4/31 - 1/32	DeVaux-Hall inline 6	70 bhp (52 kW)	113 in (2870 mm)	Standard Coupe
De Vaux	6/75	4/31 - 1/32	DeVaux-Hall inline 6	70 bhp (52 kW)	113 in (2870 mm)	Standard Sedan
De Vaux	6/75	4/31 - 1/32	DeVaux-Hall inline 6	70 bhp (52 kW)	113 in (2870 mm)	Sport Coupe (4p.)
De Vaux	6/75	4/31 - 1/32	DeVaux-Hall inline 6	70 bhp (52 kW)	113 in (2870 mm)	Sport Sedan
De Vaux	6/75	4/31 - 1/32	DeVaux-Hall inline 6	70 bhp (52 kW)	113 in (2870 mm)	De Luxe Coupe
De Vaux	6/75	4/31 - 1/32	DeVaux-Hall inline 6	70 bhp (52 kW)	113 in (2870 mm)	De Luxe Sedan
De Vaux	6/75	4/31 - 1/32	DeVaux-Hall inline 6	70 bhp (52 kW)	113 in (2870 mm)	Custom Coupe
De Vaux	6/75	4/31 - 1/32	DeVaux-Hall inline 6	70 bhp (52 kW)	113 in (2870 mm)	Custom Sedan
De Vaux Continental	6/80	2/32 - 11/32	Continental inline 6	84 bhp (63 kW)	113 in (2870 mm)	Standard Coupe
De Vaux Continental	6/80	2/32 - 11/32	Continental inline 6	84 bhp (63 kW)	113 in (2870 mm)	Standard Sedan
De Vaux Continental	6/80	2/32 - 11/32	Continental inline 6	84 bhp (63 kW)	113 in (2870 mm)	Custom Coupe
De Vaux Continental	6/80	2/32 - 11/32	Continental inline 6	84 bhp (63 kW)	113 in (2870 mm)	Custom Sedan
De Vaux Continental	6/80	2/32 - 11/32	Continental inline 6	84 bhp (63 kW)	113 in (2870 mm)	Custom Convertible Coupe

With 1,358 cars built by November, 1932, the new car was a straightaway failure. Now, Continental dropped the Continental-De Vaux Company and decided to build the car under its own label. Continentals were produced in three series: Beacon (C400) Four, Flyer Six and Ace Six. Each had its own wheelbase (101.5, 107, and 114 in., respectively). Prices started as low as $355 for a Beacon standard roadster and ended at $845 for the Ace custom sedan. Sixes shared the engine of the former De Vaux Continental 6/80. After another disastrous year with just 3,310 sales in all series, the sixes were dropped for 1934 as were 3 of the 7 bodystyles of the Beacon. Production halted forever in 1934 with 953 Beacons built.

The De Vaux Continental was built in Canada by Dominion Motors as the Frontenac 6/85 as were some Continentals.
