= Rugby (automobile) =

Defunct American motor vehicle manufacturer

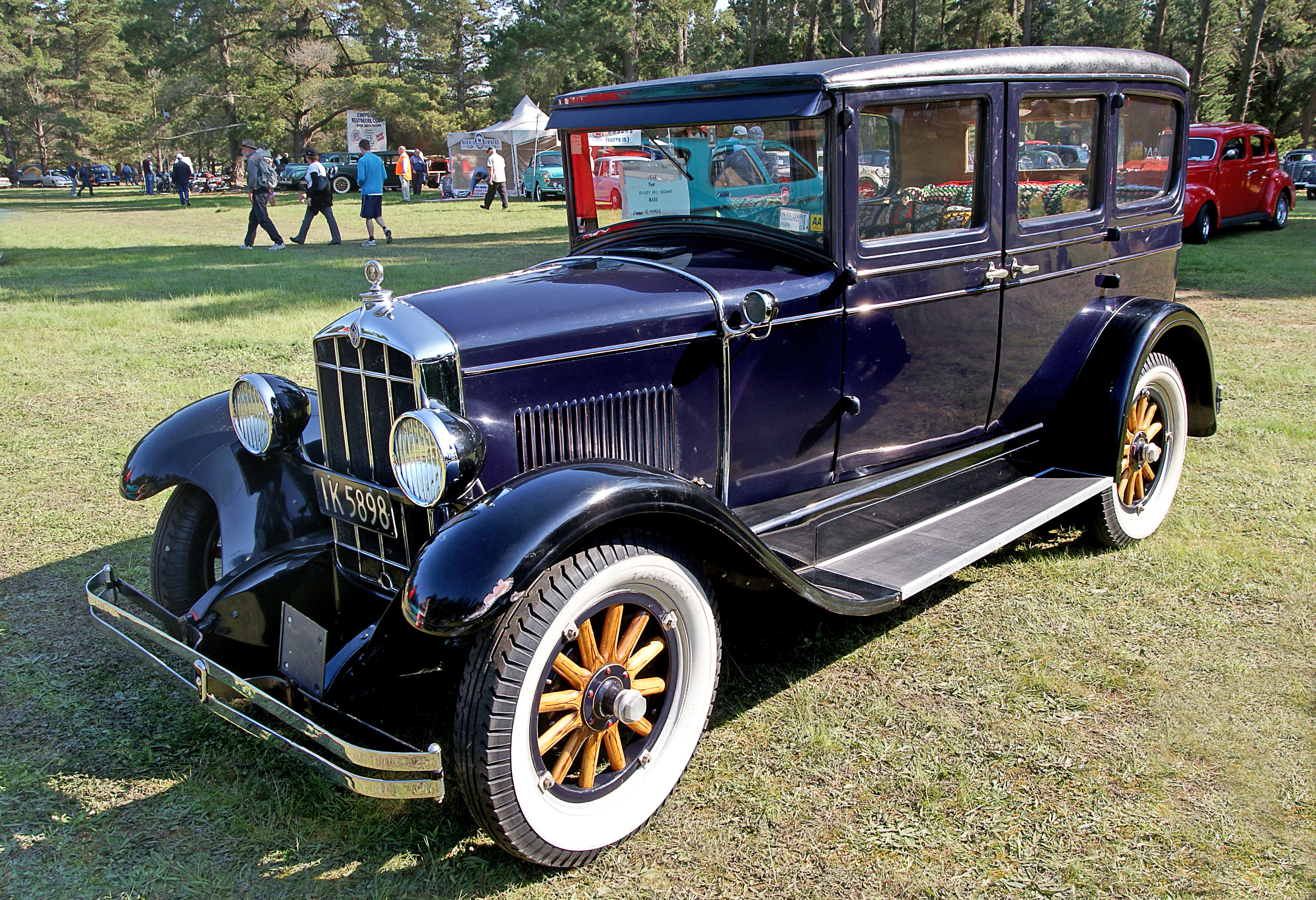
- 1928 Rugby M2 Sedan

Overview
- Type: Passenger Car
- Manufacturer: Durant Motors, Dominion Motors, LTD
- Production: 1924–1933

Body and chassis
- Related: Star, Durant

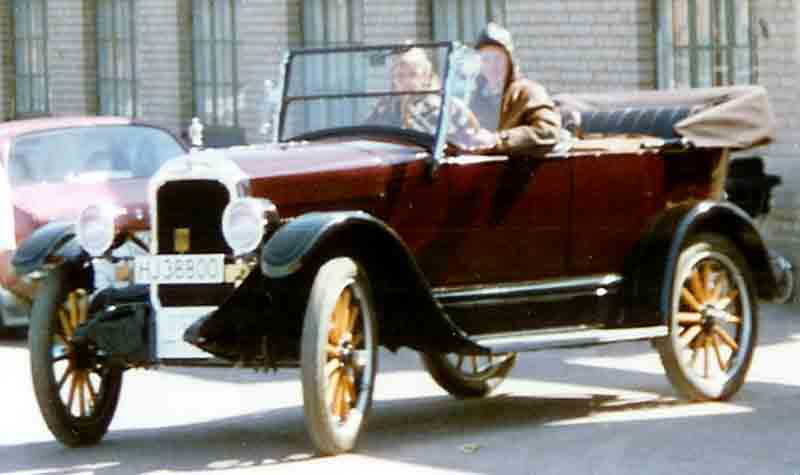
1924 Rugby Tourer

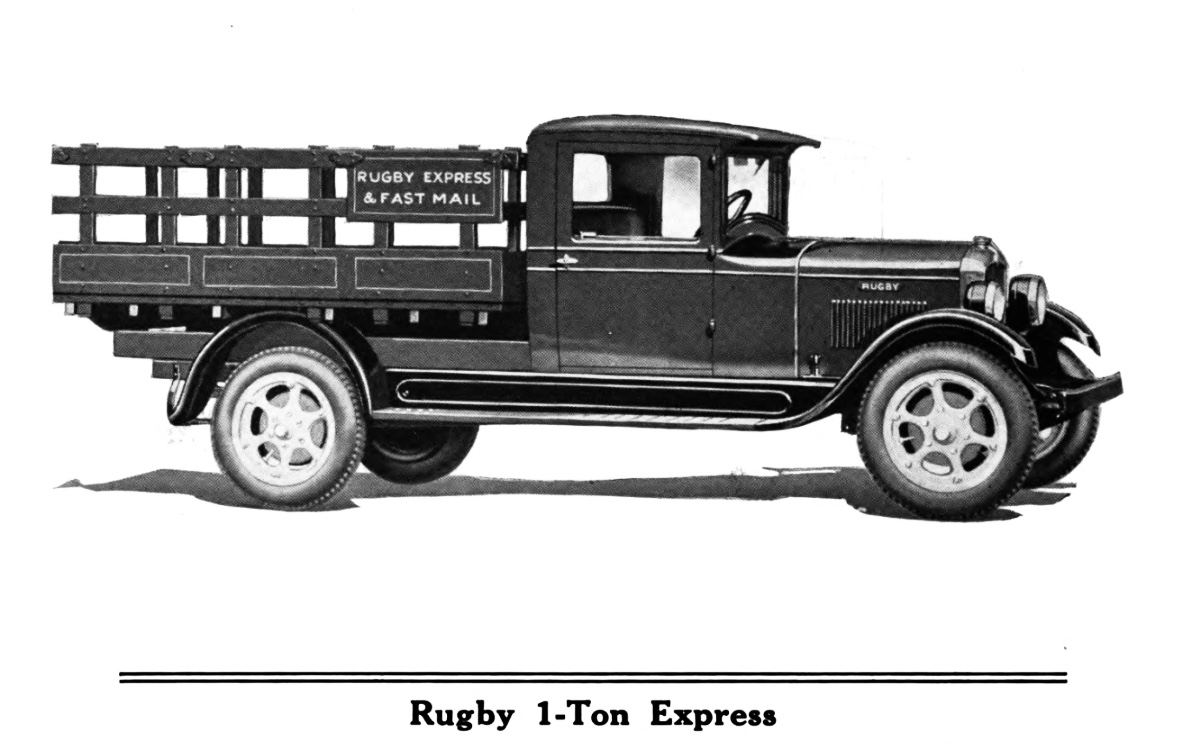
Rugby 1t Express (1928)

The Rugby was a brand of automobiles assembled by the Durant Motors Company of New York City, New York (USA). Beside badges and right-hand drive for some models, the vehicle was identical to Durant's Star car, and was assigned to export markets by Durant Motors, due to the name Star being under copyright by the Star Motor Company in the British Commonwealth.

== History ==
The Rugby was built from 1923 based on the Star automobile design and production ended March 31 1928 together with the Star.

Durant Rugby vehicles were marketed in the British Commonwealth, notably South Africa, Australia and New Zealand where numerous examples still survive amongst vintage car enthusiasts. The Star name was changed to Durant April 1 1928 and all 4-cylinder Durant's exported carried the Rugby name until the end of the Durant line in Canada in 1932.

Commercial cars were marketed based on the Rugby. Some Durant commercial vehicles were badged Rugby's and sold in the US and Canada for 1928. Commercial trucks 6 cyl from January 1 1928 and 4 cyl from Sept 5 1928 were Rugby's to the end of production in 1933 at Dominion Motors in Leaside. The last remaining US plant in 1931 was Lansing which stopped in August 1931. Leaside became Canadian owned January 14 1931, as Dominion Motors, Ltd. and they chose to continue the Durant car into 1932 and Rugby truck end of 1933.

REO cars were also built there beginning in 1932. In August 1931, Dominion made the Canadian Frontenac car to the end of 1933. All production stopped in December 1933. The company charter was finally surrendered in 1944.

Production of the Rugby occurred at the following plants:

- Elizabeth, New Jersey (Star and Rugby)
- Lansing, Michigan (Star and Rugby)
- Long Island City, New York (Star)
- Oakland, California (Star and Rugby)
- Leaside (Toronto), Canada (Star and Rugby)
