= Star Motor Car Company =

Defunct American motor vehicle manufacturer

- Company type: Truck Company
- Industry: Manufacturing
- Founded: 1909; 117 years ago
- Founder: Fred O. Paige and H. A. Wilcox
- Defunct: 1917; 109 years ago
- Headquarters: Ann Arbor, Michigan, US
- Products: Trucks

The Star Motor Car Company of Ann Arbor, Michigan, was a truck manufacturer.

== History ==
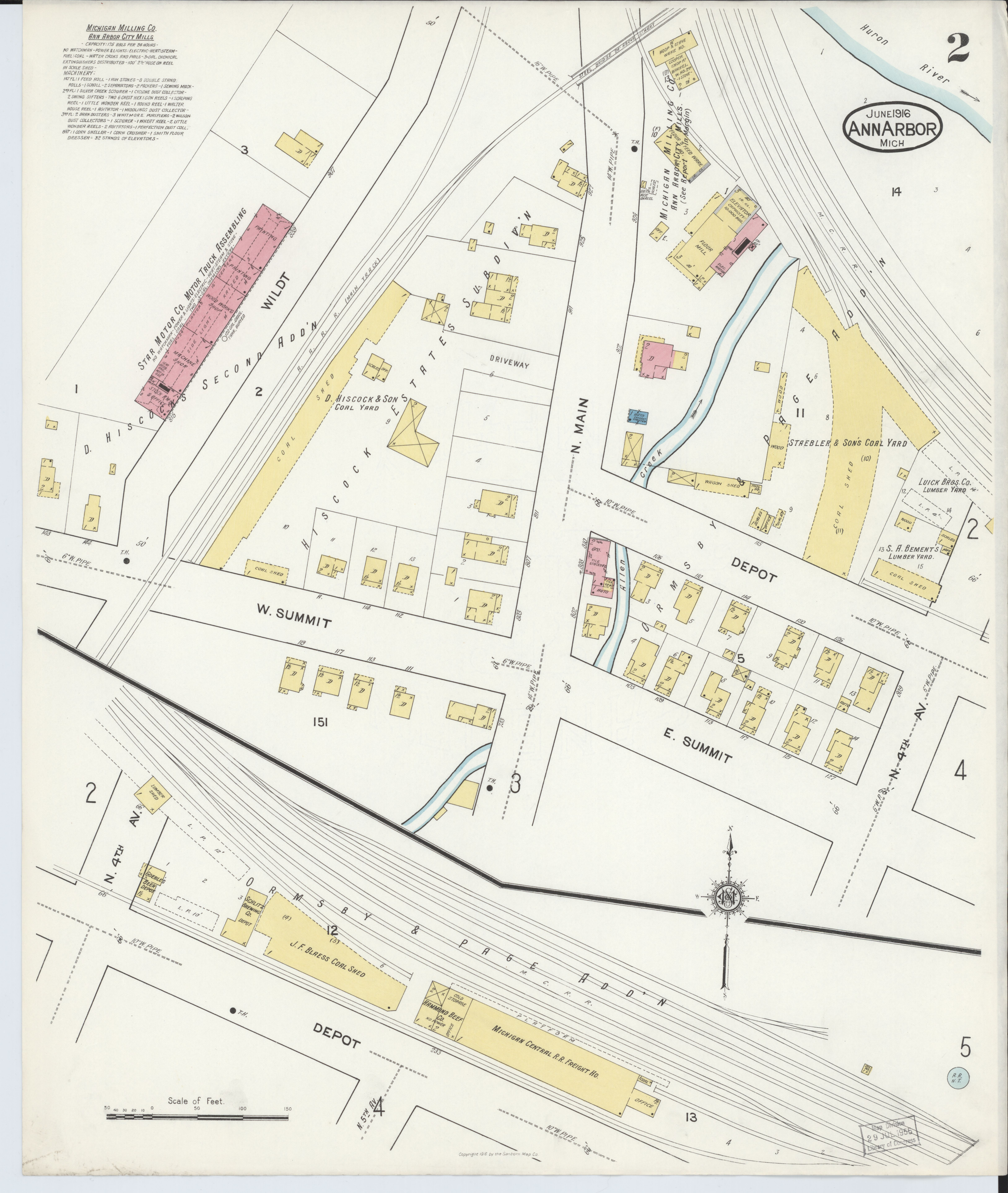
Star Motor Car Company plant (1916)

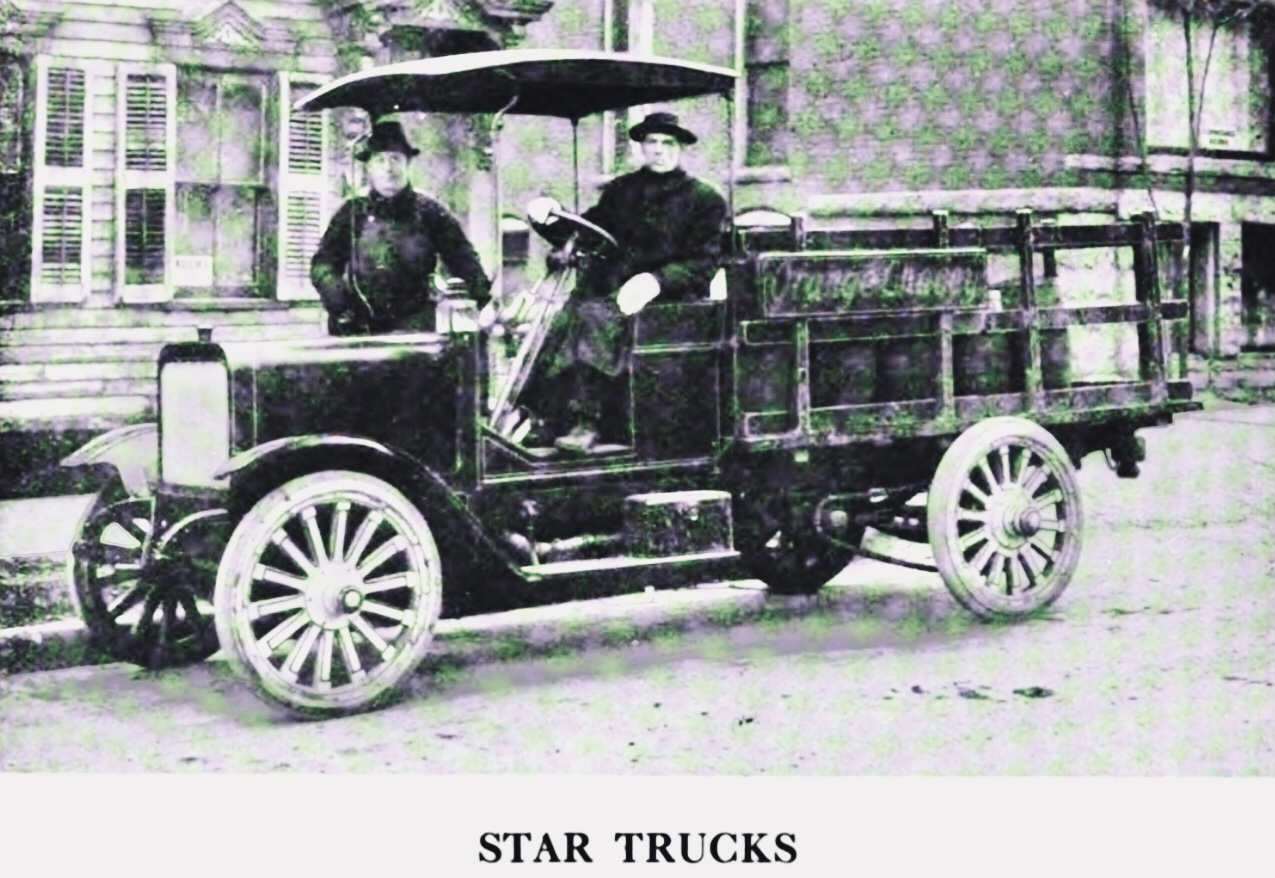
Star Truck Model A „Ann Arbor“ (1914)

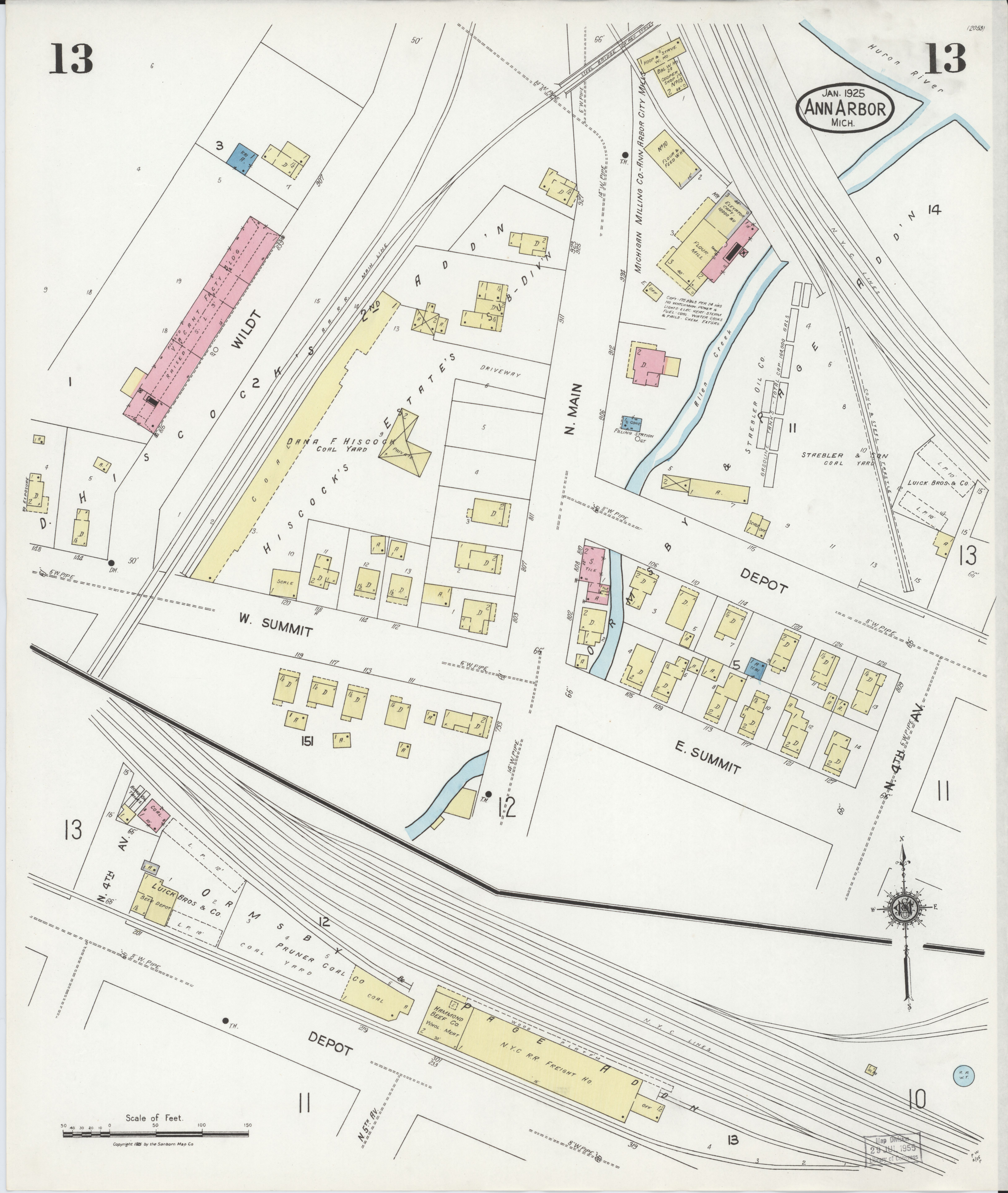
Star Motor Car Company plant vacant building (1925)

In April 1909, Fred O. Paige and H. A. Wilcox founded a company in Ann Arbor to manufacture gasoline-powered trucks. The starting capital was $340,000. Both partners had previously worked at the Reliance Motor Truck Company, one as president and the other as chief engineer. The trucks were often also referred to as 'Ann Arbor'. A building measuring 600 by 65 feet is planned to serve as the production hall. An additional approximately $225,000 will be required from the businessmen for this building. In 1914, the Star Motor Car Company had a capital of $400,000. The factory was located on Wildt Street in Ann Arbor. Production was stopped around 1917. An exact date is currently not known. In 1925, the production building was still available for sale. There is no connection to the Star automobiles from Durant Motors.

== Production Models ==
In 1914, the Model A, a 1.5-ton, and the Model B, a 0.75-ton, were produced. The Model A had an engine displacement of 4599 cc with a bore of 104.775 mm and a stroke of 133.35 mm. The engine produced 35 hp. The wheelbase was 3,302 mm. The Model B had an engine displacement of 3801 cc with a bore of 95.25 mm and a stroke of 133.35 mm. The engine produced 30 hp. The wheelbase was 3,048 mm.
