= Sheridan (automobile) =

Defunct American motor vehicle manufacturer

Sheridan Motor Car Company
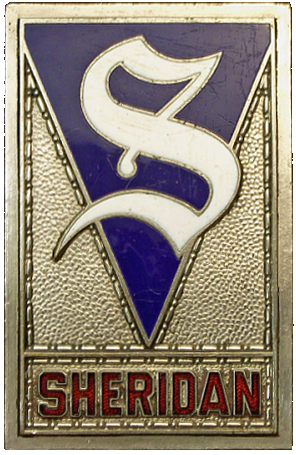
- Industry: Automotive
- Founded: 1920; 106 years ago
- Defunct: 1921; 105 years ago
- Fate: Dissolved
- Successor: Durant Motors
- Headquarters: Muncie, Indiana, United States
- Key people: William C. Durant, D. A. Burke, Eddie Rickenbacker
- Products: Automobiles
- Production output: unknown (1920-1921)
- Parent: General Motors

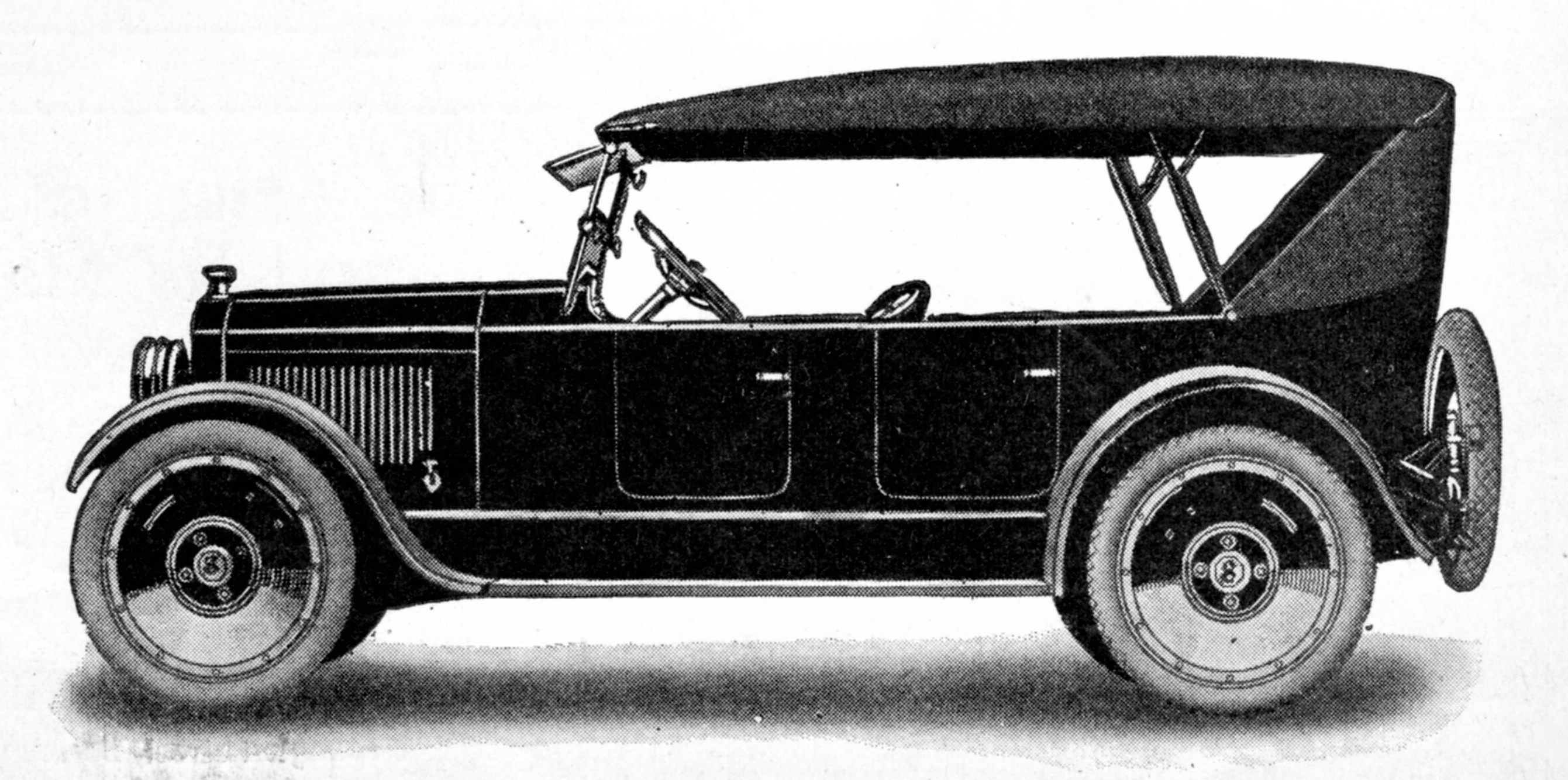
1920–21 Sheridan Touring Car

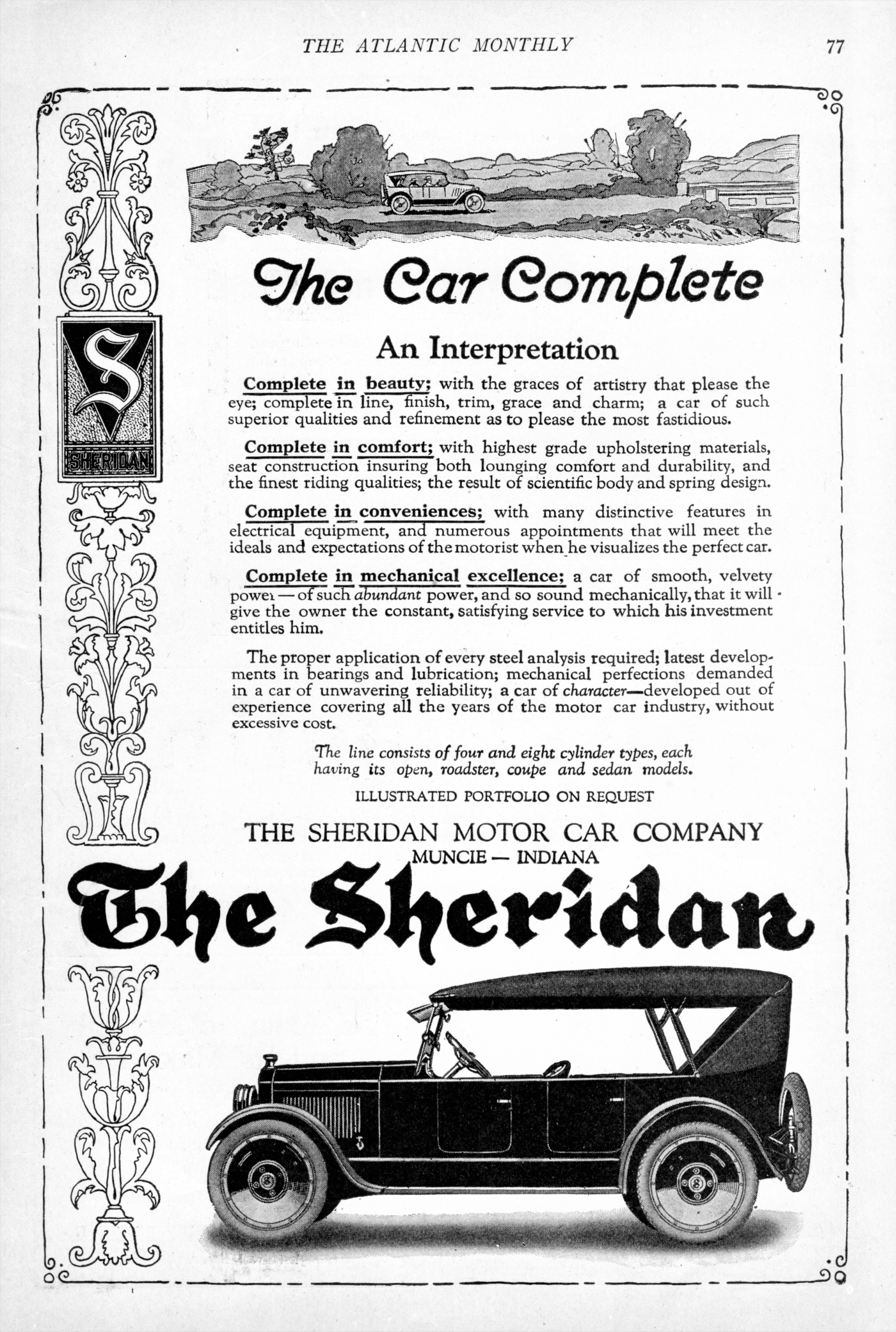
1920 Sheridan advertisement in the Atlantic Monthly

The Sheridan was a brand of American automobile manufactured from 1920 to 1921. Manufacture of the car was based in Muncie, Indiana. The Sheridan nameplate has the distinction of being the first automotive brand started from scratch by General Motors. Prior to the Sheridan, General Motors, under William (Billy) Durant, grew its automotive marques Chevrolet, Oakland, Oldsmobile, Buick and Cadillac, by acquiring independent manufacturers and then folding their operations into the GM structure.

== History ==
Throughout his years at GM, Billy Durant was interested acquiring outside companies and new products to grow the GM empire, many times without great success. When Buick's D. A. Burke approached Durant about the idea of designing a car from the ground up, and then marketing the brand in 2 ranges: one as a bridge vehicle between GM's established divisions of Chevrolet and Oakland (a four-cylinder range) and the other between Buick and Cadillac (an eight-cylinder [V8] range). Both engines were to be supplied by GM's Northway engine-making division. Durant approved the project and the Inter-State Automobile factory in Muncie, Indiana, which had been idle since 1918, was purchased.

To market the Sheridan, Burke hired World War I flying ace Eddie Rickenbacker, himself an accomplished automobile racer in his own right. Through prosaic marketing, and Rickenbacker's endorsements, Sheridan officials felt the production target of 300 cars a day was not only achievable, but profitable as well.

Just as production began to ramp up, Durant was fired for the second and final time from General Motors. Since the Sheridan was a Durant pet project, GM, now under Alfred Sloan, was left with Sheridan, one of Durant's more costly but viable caprices. Durant on the other hand knew that the vehicle was soundly engineered and knew what GM paid for the Muncie facility. In May 1921, Durant purchased the rights to the Sheridan and to the Muncie plant, with the intent on using the facility to continue building the Sheridan and Durant's new project, the Durant and Princeton automobiles, now to be built by Durant Motors.

Despite a backlog of orders that went unfulfilled, production was wound down to begin production of the Durant automobile. Rickenbacker abandoned his role as the spokesman for the company, and the Sheridan ceased to exist by September, 1921.
