= Star Two Door Sedan =

Type of automobile

The Star Two Door Sedan was manufactured by the Star division of Durant Motors.

== Star Two Door Sedan specifications (1926 data) ==
- Color – Blue lacquer with nickel radiator
- Seating Capacity – Five
- Wheelbase – 102 inches
- Wheels – Wood
- Tires - 30” x 3-1/2” cord
- Service Brakes – Contracting on rear
- Emergency Brakes – Expanding on rear
- Engine - Four cylinder, vertical, cast en bloc, 3-3/8 x 4-1/4 inches; head removable; valves in side; H.P. 18.2 N.A.C.C. rating
- Lubrication – Full force feed
- Crankshaft - Three bearing
- Radiator – Cellular type
- Cooling – Centrifugal water pump
- Ignition – Storage Battery
- Starting System – Two Unit
- Voltage – Six
- Wiring System – Single
- Gasoline System – Vacuum
- Clutch – Single plate dry disc
- Transmission – Selective sliding
- Gear Changes – 3 forward, 1 reverse
- Drive – Spiral bevel
- Springs – Semi-elliptic
- Rear Axle – Semi-floating
- Steering Gear – Worm and gear

=== Standard equipment ===
New car price included the following items:

- tools
- jack
- speedometer
- ammeter
- motor driven horn
- ignition theft lock
- demountable rims
- spare tire carrier

Closed cars have the following standard:

- sun visor
- rear vision mirror
- windshield wiper

=== Optional equipment ===
The following was available at an extra cost:

none listed

=== Prices ===
New car prices were F.O.B. factory, plus Tax:

- Touring - $540
- Coupster - $625
- Coupé - $715
- Two Door Sedan - $750
- Four Door Sedan - $820

== See also ==
- Star (automobile)
