= Mason Truck =

Defunct American motor vehicle manufacturer

Powertrain
- Engine: gasoline

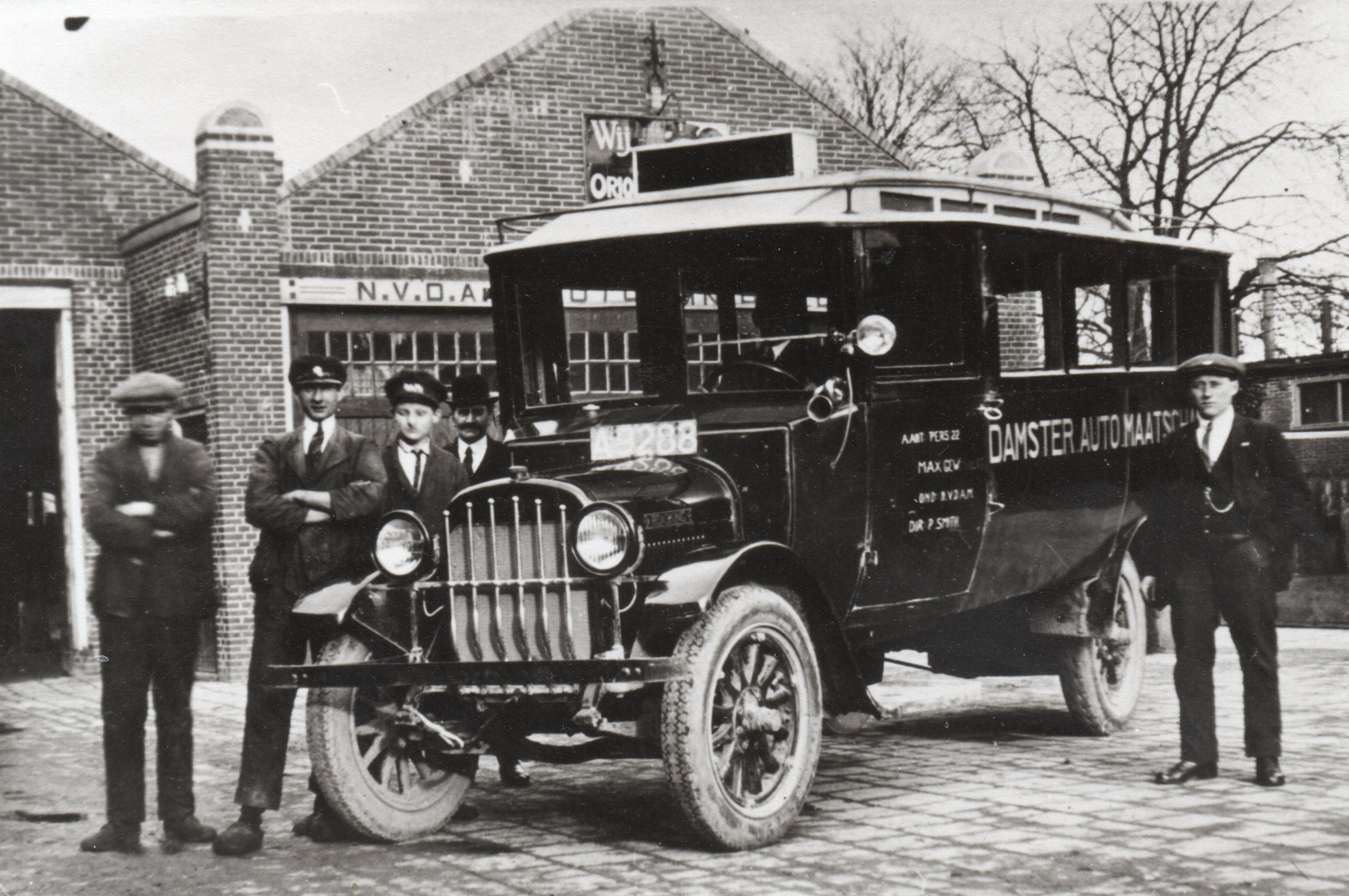
Mason Road King bus in The Netherlands, 1922

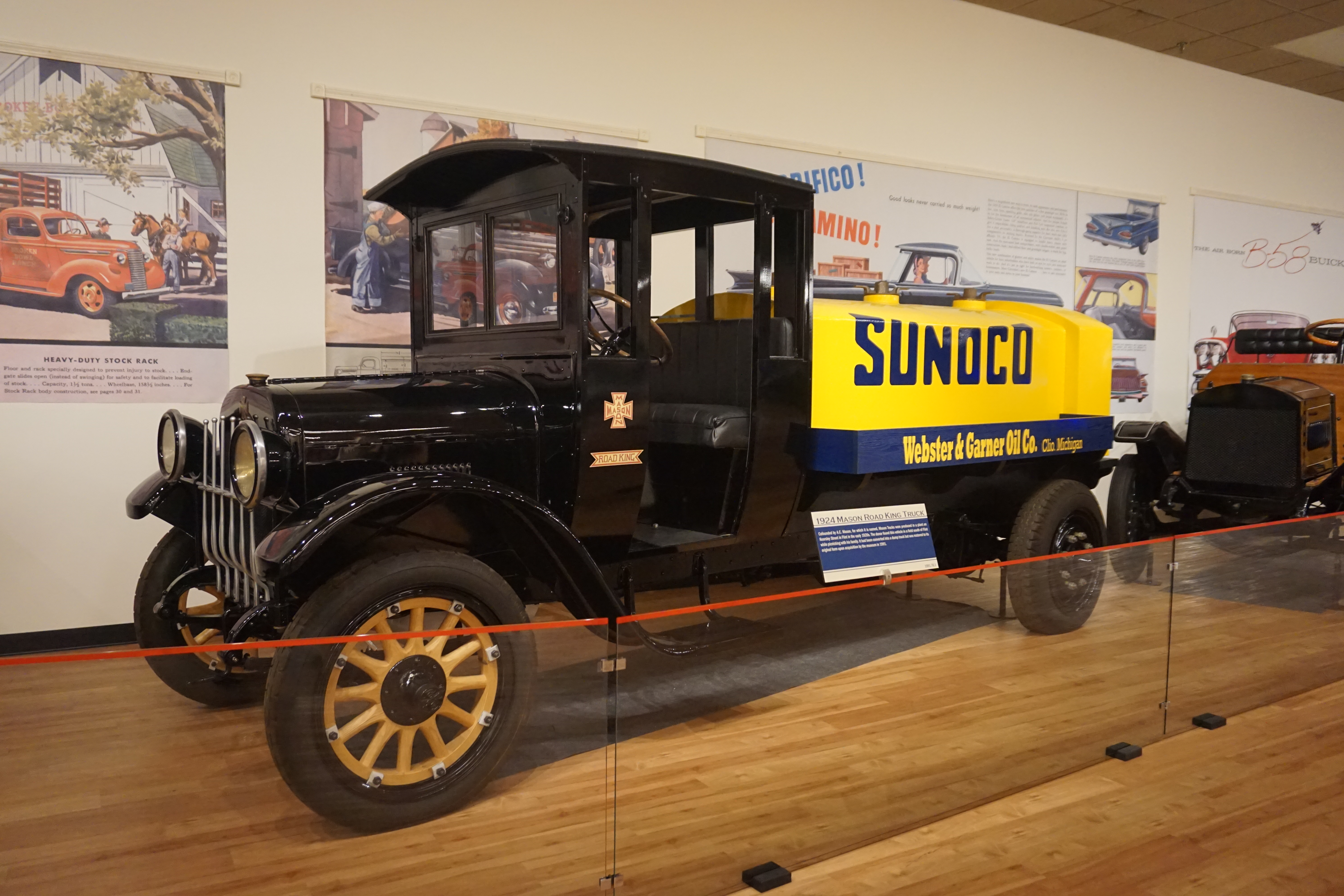
1924 Mason Road King truck at the Sloan Museum

Mason Motors, founded by A. C. Mason in cooperation with William C. Durant, was a U.S. truck manufacturer based in Flint, Michigan. As a subsidiary of Durant Motors, Mason Truck built Road King Speed Trucks in the early 1920s. Mason Motors also built automobile engines in 1911, who first led Buick's engine works in Flint. That company was absorbed by Chevrolet in 1915, but remained under the Chevrolet umbrella until January 1, 1918, when it became known as the Motor and Axle Division of Chevrolet.

There were four separate automobile companies using the name "Mason" between 1898 and 1914 with locations in Massachusetts, Iowa, Illinois and New York. Records show that Mason Motors of Flint, MI was a truck manufacturer and also supplied engines for Buick use, but they did not manufacture passenger automobiles.
