= Star (automobile) =

Defunct American motor vehicle manufacturer

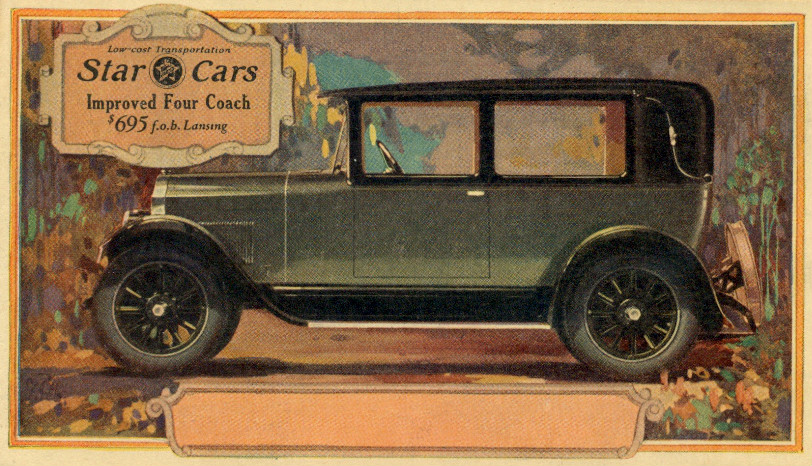
- Star Improved Four Coach c-1923

Overview
- Type: Passenger Car
- Manufacturer: Durant Motors, Star Motors, Inc.
- Also called: Rugby, Durant Star
- Model years: 1922–1928
- Assembly: Elizabeth, New Jersey

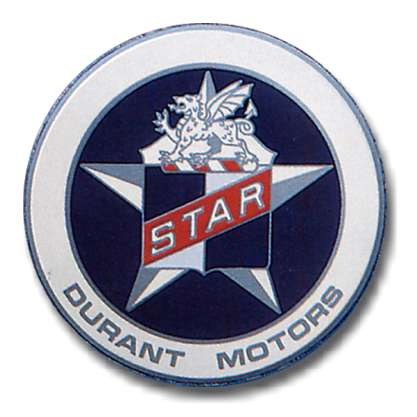
Durant Star logo

Star was an American automobile company that was assembled by the Durant Motors Company between 1922 and 1928. Also known as the Star Car, Star was envisioned as a competitor against the Ford Model T and Chevrolet. In the United Kingdom, it was sold as the Rugby, to avoid confusion with the British marque.

== History ==
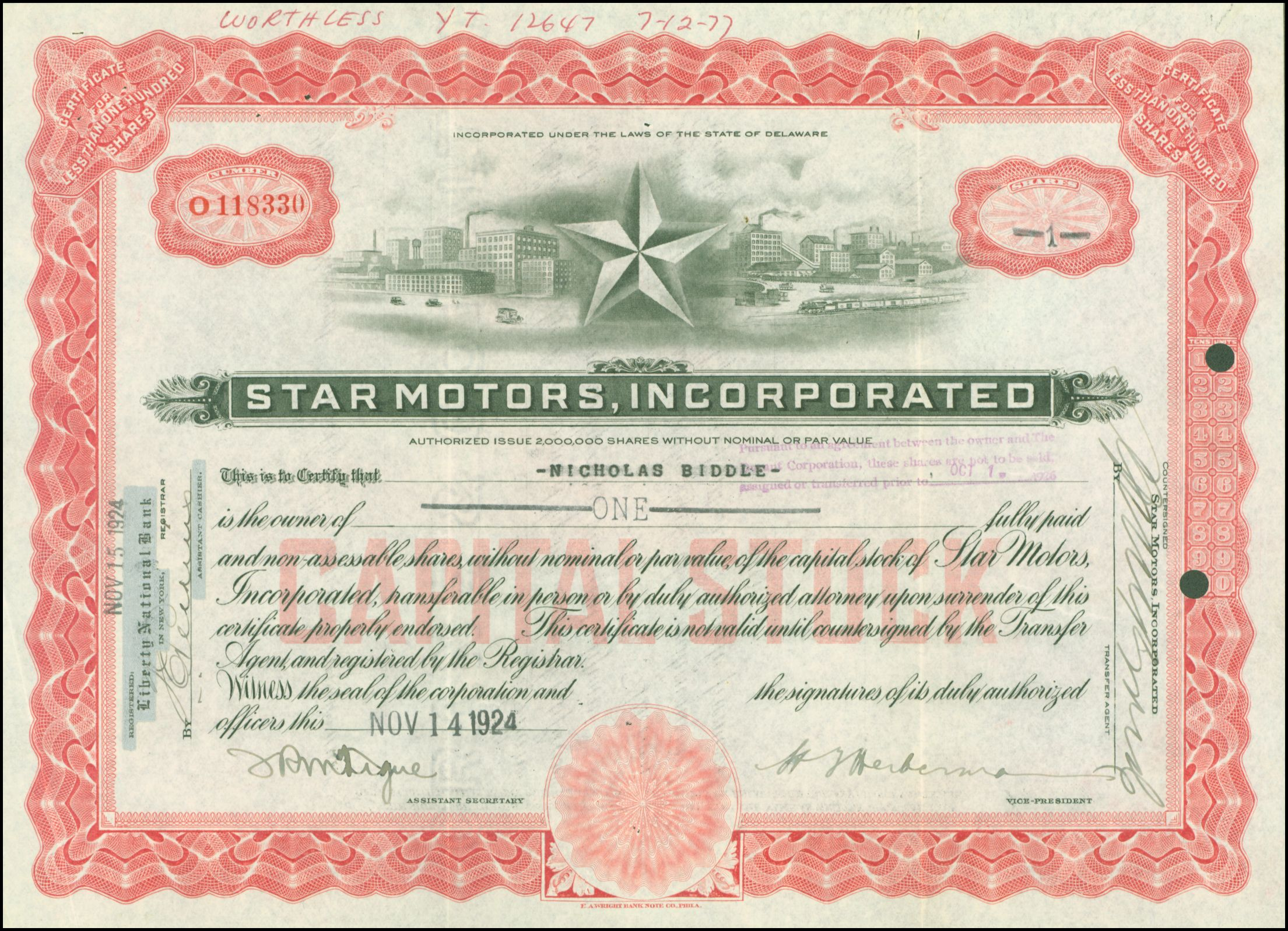
Share of the Star Motors, Inc., issued 14. November 1924

Like other products of the Durant Motors Company, the Star was an "assembled car", built from parts supplied by various outside companies. Originally, Stars were powered by a four-cylinder engine. In 1926, the line introduced a six-cylinder engine. All factory-installed engines were built by Continental. Durant was Continental's biggest customer in the 1920s taking up to 85% of its output.

Star cars were first produced in Durant's Long Island City plant before production moved to the new factory in Elizabeth, New Jersey. Star would also be manufactured in other Durant factories in Lansing, Michigan, Oakland, California and Toronto, Ontario.

Star was planned to undercut Chevrolet prices and match Ford prices, starting in 1922 at $348 (equivalent to $6,694 in 2025) for a touring car, Ford slashed prices by $50 in mid 1923, which Star could not match. Star was able to match Chevrolet prices during most of its life, ranging from $443 in 1923 to $525 (equivalent to $9,731 in 2025) in 1927 for a touring car.

In 1923, Star became the first car company to offer a production station wagon. Instead of shipping a chassis out to a custom builder, who added a wooden wagon body, the wagon body was delivered to the Star factory and fitted to the chassis there.

For the early part of the 1928 model year, the Star was known as the Durant Star and was only available with a four-cylinder engine. The car was replaced in the latter half of the 1928 model year by the Durant 4.

Production from 1923 to 1928 totaled 358,689 vehicles.

== Models ==
- Star Two Door Sedan
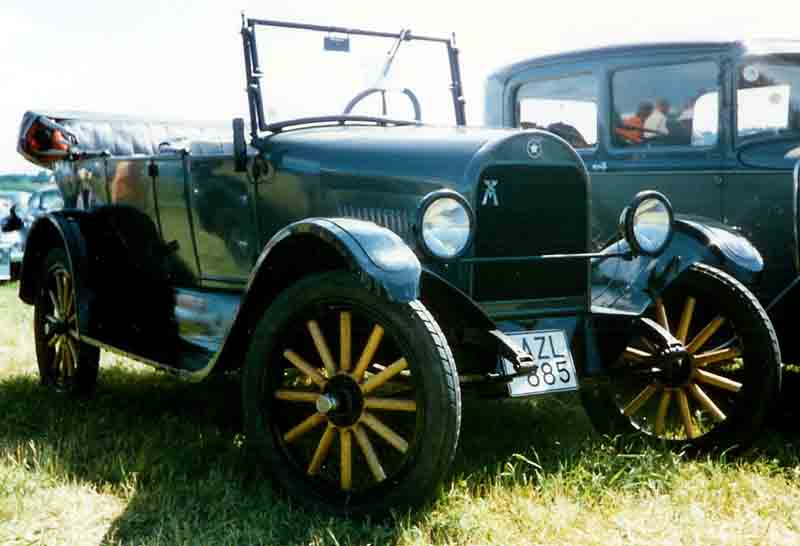
1922 Star Touring Car

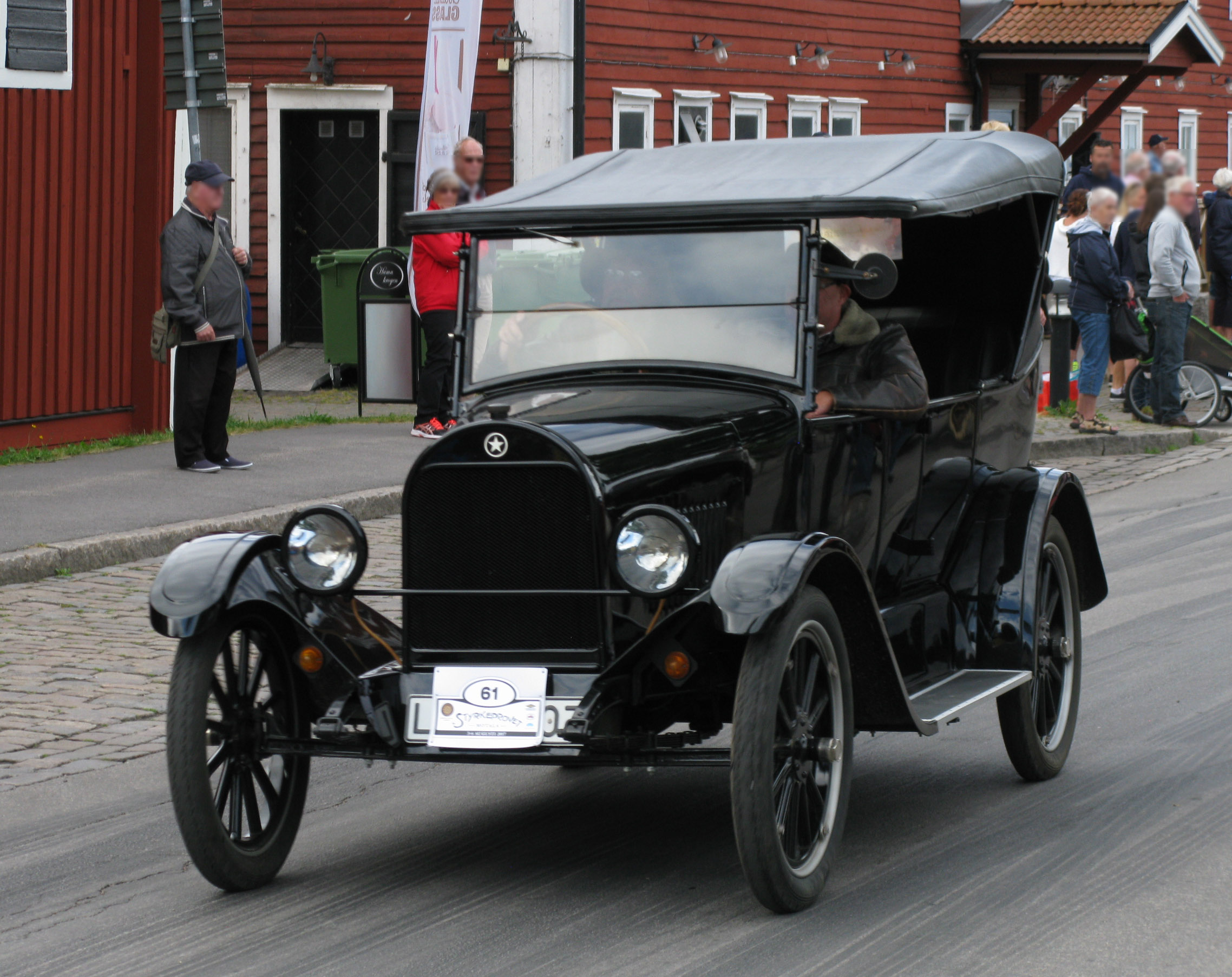
1923 Star Touring Car

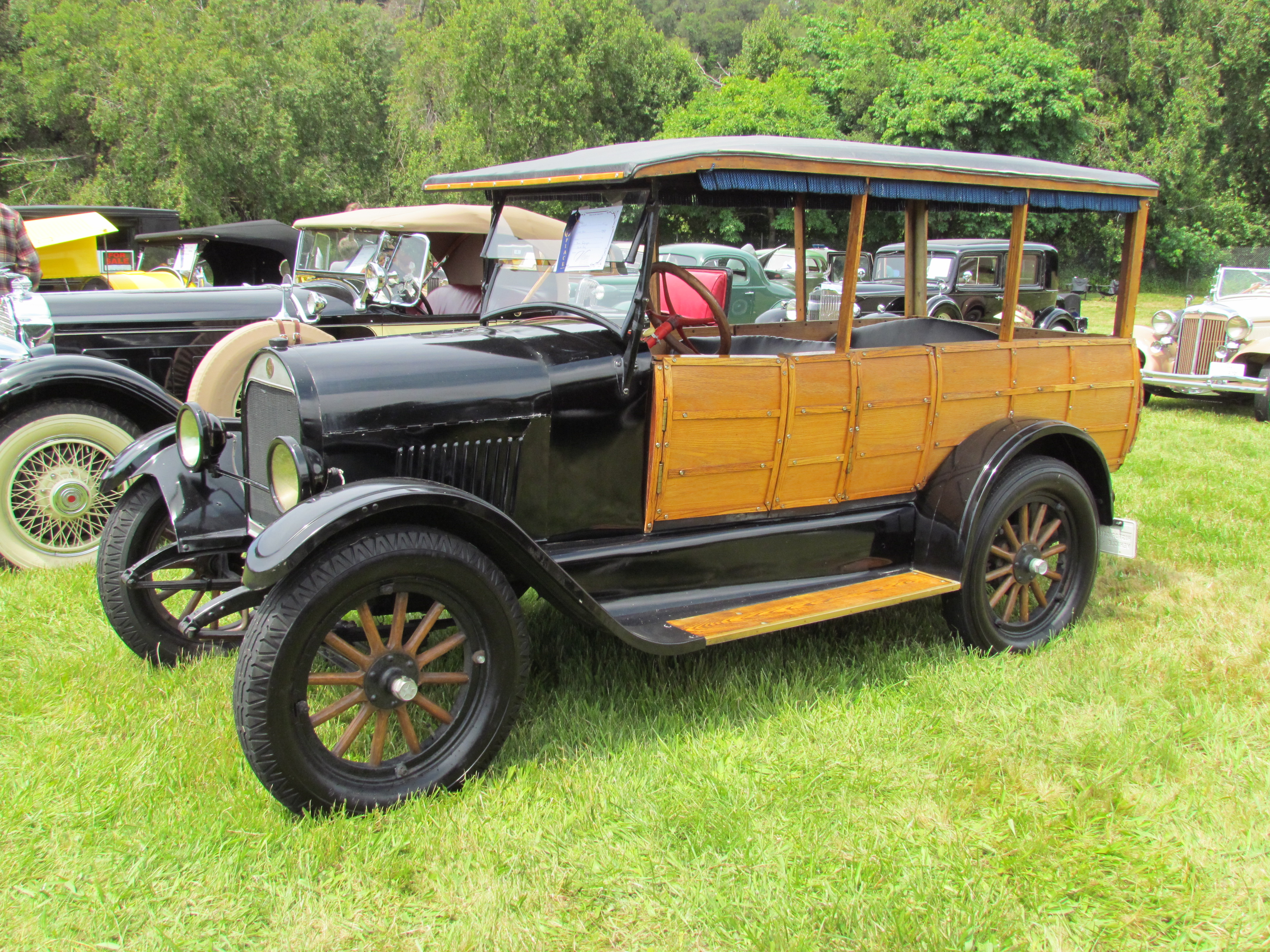
1923 Star Four model C Station Wagon

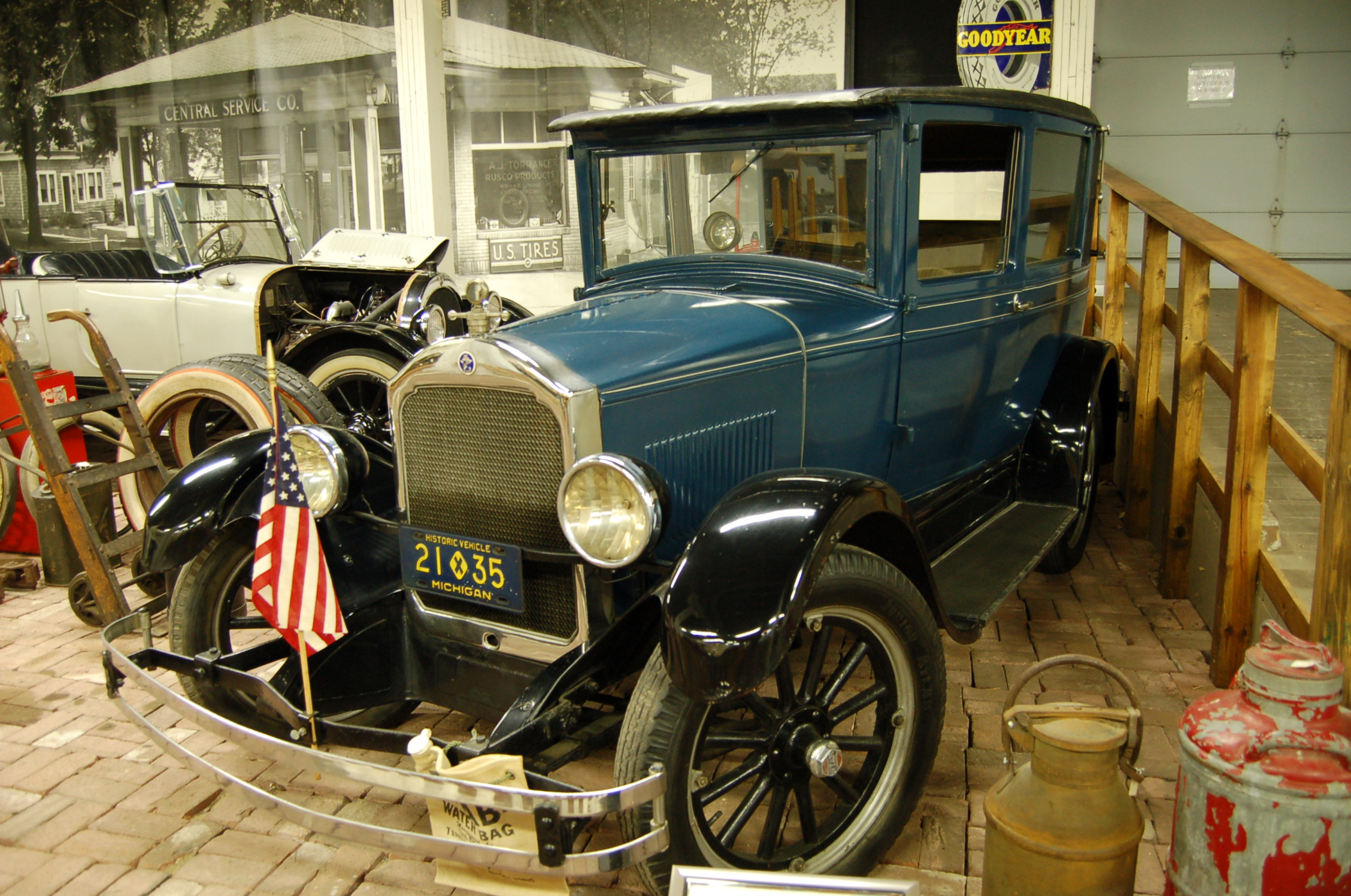
1926 Star Coach

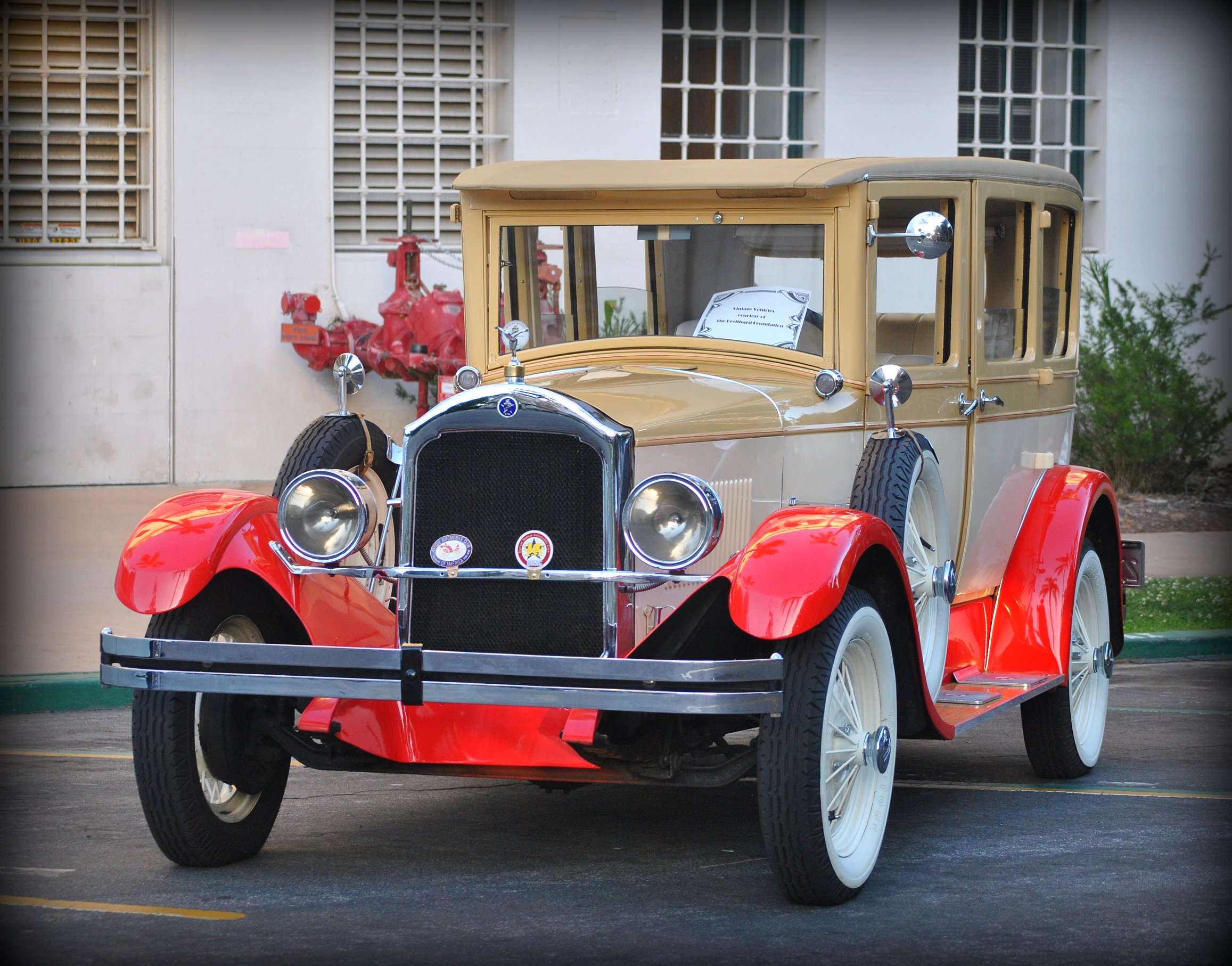
1927 Star 4 door sedan

Model	Year	cylinder	performance	wheelbase	bodies
Four	1922-1923	4	35 bhp (26 kW)	102-in	Runabout 2 seats, Roadster 2 seats, Touring car 5 seats, Coupé 2 doors, Sedan 4 doors
F	1924	4	35 bhp (26 kW)	102-in	Roadster 2 seats, touring car 5 seats, coupe 2 doors, sedan 4 doors
F-25	1925	4	35 bhp (26 kW)	102-in	Roadster 2 seats, touring car 5 seats, coupe 2 doors, sedan 4 doors
Four	1926-1928	4	30 bhp (22 kW)	102-in	Roadster 2 seats, touring car 5 seats, coupe 2 doors, sedan 2/4 doors
Six	1926-1927	6	40 bhp (29 kW)	107-in	Roadster 2 seats, touring car 5 seats, coupe 2 doors, sedan 2/4 doors, landaulet 4 doors

Star offered light commercial vehicles derived from the passenger cars.

== See also ==
- Durant Motors
