= De Vaux =

Automobile manufacturer

DeVaux-Hall Motors Corporation
- Industry: Automotive
- Founded: December 15, 1930; 95 years ago in Grand Rapids, Michigan, U.S.
- Founder: Norman DeVaux; Elbert J. Hall
- Defunct: February 13, 1932
- Fate: Receivership with all company assets sold to Continental Motors Company
- Successor: Continental Motors Company
- Area served: Worldwide
- Products: Automobiles

The De Vaux (/dəˈvoʊ/) was an automobile produced by the De Vaux-Hall Motors Company of Grand Rapids, Michigan, and Oakland, California. It was founded by Norman de Vaux and Elbert J. Hall. The company was incorporated on December 15, 1930. The company sold automobiles under the "DeVaux" brand from April 1931 until February 1932, when the company went into receivership.

== History ==
=== Founding ===
Norman de Vaux (1876-1964) was a famed cross country cyclist and had become a successful Cadillac dealer by 1903 and a west coast distributor for Buick. Forming a personal relationship with General Motors president William C. Durant, he followed with him professionally when he established Chevrolet and again when he formed Durant Motors. De Vaux grew wealthy by gaining distribution rights for several western states during these years and selling his shares in Chevrolet for $4 Million. De Vaux continued to work as an executive of Durant until its dissolution.

Elbert J. Hall was renowned for building motors and race cars which gained him financial backing and wealth through Hall-Scott Motor Car Company, which was founded in 1910.

In1930, De Vaux purchased control of Durant. Using the assets of Durant, De Vaux partnered with Hall and incorporated the DeVaux-Hall Motors Corporation as a new company on December 15, 1930.

=== Production ===
Heavily based on the 1930 Durant, production began with the 1931 model year. Bodies for the cars were built by Hayes Mfg. Co. of Grand Rapids, which had leased a plant next to its own to De Vaux for initial manufacture. Bodies were delivered to De Vaux by using a bridge between the plants. Later, a smaller number of De Vaux cars were built in a former Durant plant in Oakland, California.

The cars were powered by an inline-six engine designed by Elbert J. Hall, a partner in the venture, and built by the Continental Motors Company of Muskegon, Michigan. The De Vaux engine was a modified Continental 22-A engine, most of the changes being made to the block, manifolds, and carburetor, and it developed 70 or 80 hp (52 or 60 kW; 71 or 81 PS).

The De Vaux was offered in one model only, the 6/75, and rode on a 113 in (2,900 mm) wheelbase. Bodies were essentially the same as the defunct Durant, but got a minor facelift from Russian-born stylist Alexis de Sakhnoffsky. Sakhnoffsky designed for other automakers including Cord, Auburn, Nash, Packard, and American Bantam. The company frequently mentioned the "de Sakhnoffsky styled" body in its ads. Offered were a Coupe and a Sedan in Standard trim or Custom trim, priced at $595 and $795, respectively. A $545 Phaeton is occasionally mentioned, but may not have been produced. A few 1932 Custom convertible coupes survive.

Production began in Grand Rapids on April 1, 1931, and the company claimed to have over 8,000 orders in hand. Firm orders were far fewer, so production at the two plants was reduced. Oakland was second of the two plants to begin production and the first to close.

=== Insolvency ===
De Vaux-Hall filed for bankruptcy in February 1932, unable to pay its creditors (including Continental). De Vaux produced 4,808 vehicles (maybe including production until January, 1932). Days after De Vaux-Hall announced its bankruptcy, Continental Motors Corporation announced it would buy the Michigan assets of De Vaux-Hall; De Vaux-Hall owed the engine maker nearly a half million dollars. The new owner renamed the company Continental-De Vaux Company. Their cars were then called Continental De Vaux (sometimes vice versa). There were few changes and only 1,358 were built (sources differ).

Continental came out in the 1933 model year with their own cars, not based on the Durant/De Vaux cars. It renamed the company Continental Automobile Company in November 1932. It built three models: the 4-cylinder Beacon, on a shorter chassis, and the 6-cylinder Ace and Flyer, both based on the De Vaux. For 1934, only the Beacon remained, renamed the Red Seal Four. After producing approximately 4,200 vehicles during the 1933 and 1934 model years, Continental gave up. Remaining assets were repurchased by Norman De Vaux who hoped to restart production. His plans never materialized and he sold his California plant to General Motors in 1936.

== Sources ==
- Bradford, Francis and Ric Dias, "Hall-Scott: the Untold Story of a Great American Engine Maker," SAE Int'l, 2007 ISBN 978-0-7680-1660-4
- Dias, Ric, "E.J. Hall's Life of Power," Automobile Quarterly, 48, First Quarter 2008, 62-75
