= Flint (automobile) =

Former american car manufacturer

Logo for the Flint Automobile, 1923–1927

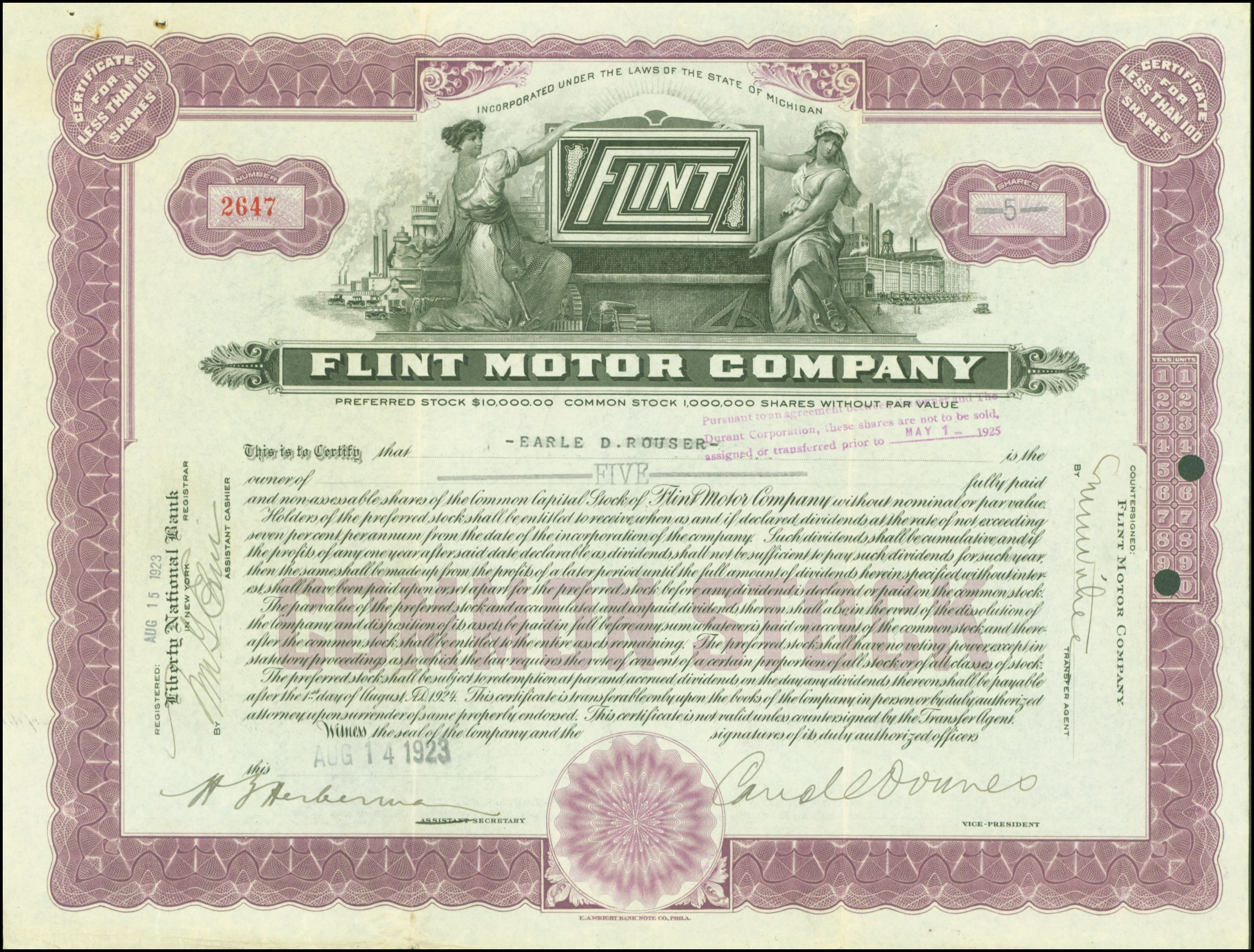
Share of the Flint Motor Company, issued 14. August 1923

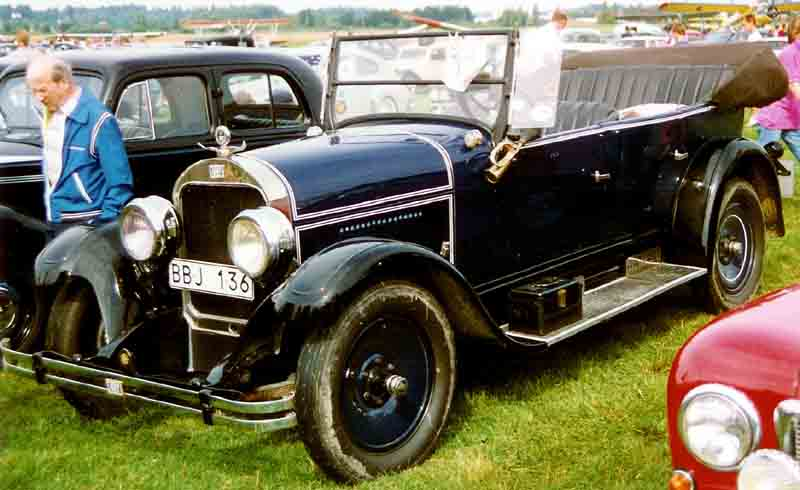
Flint B-40 Touring 1925

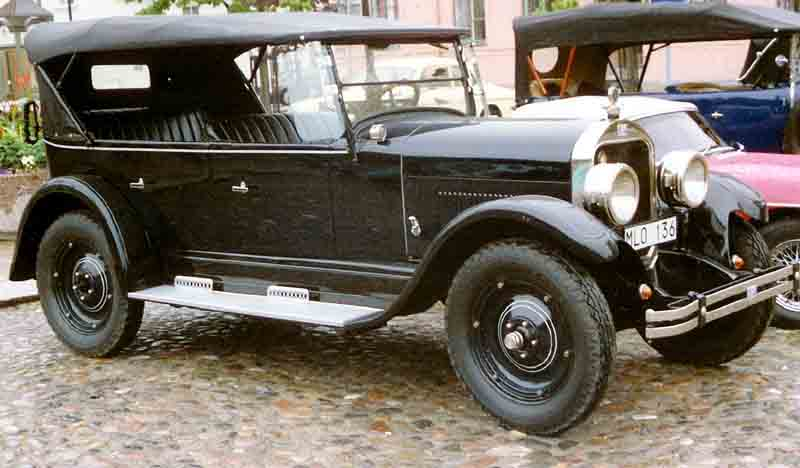
Flint B-40 Touring 1925

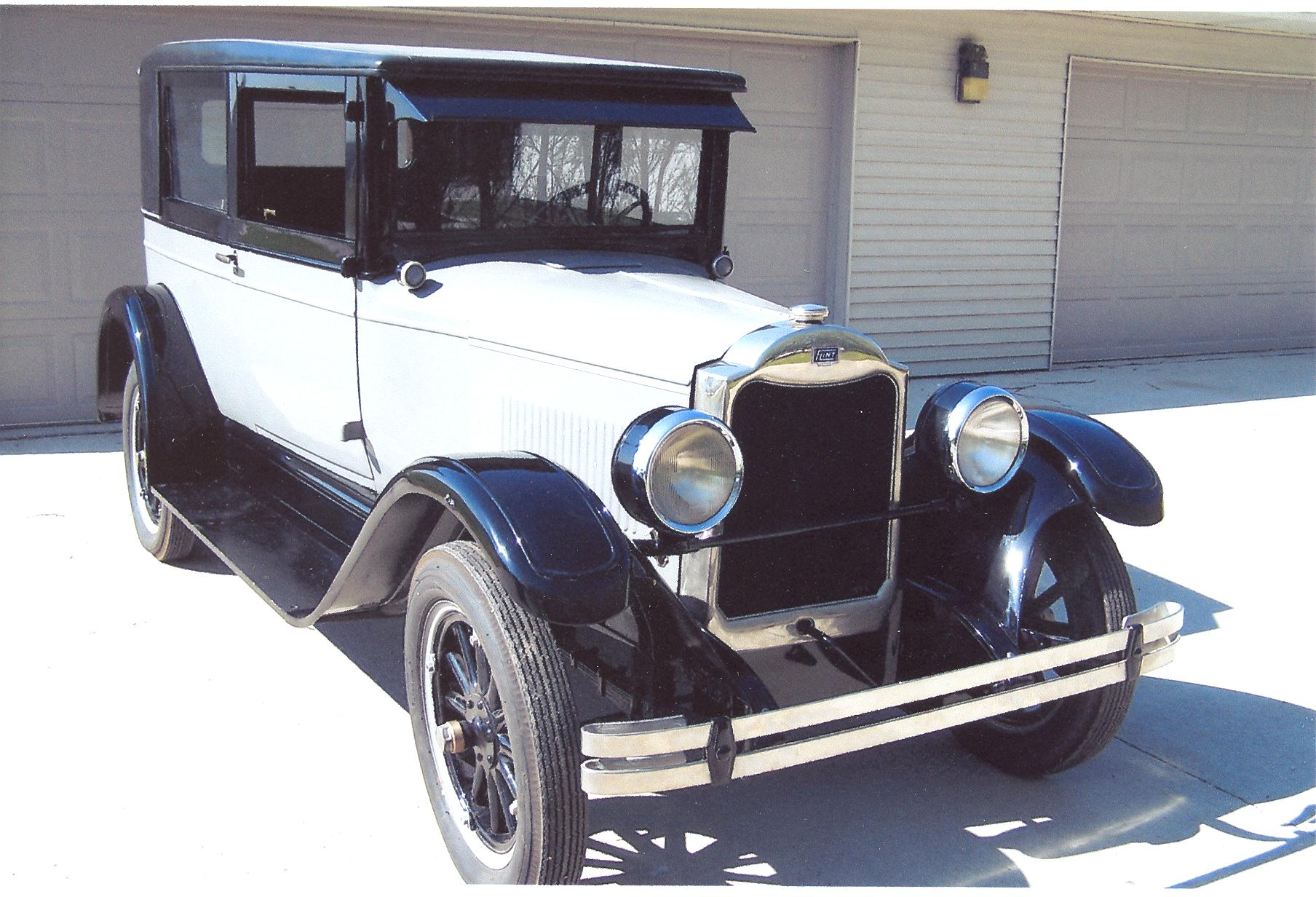
1926 Flint Jr. Z18 Deluxe Coupe located in Stratford, Iowa, USA

The Flint was an automobile marque that was assembled by the Flint Motors Division, Flint, Michigan between 1923 and 1927. Flint Motors was a wholly owned subsidiary of Durant Motors Company (United States).

== Assembly ==
The Flint was considered an assembled car because Durant Motors used components manufactured by outside suppliers to build its automobile lines. The cars were powered by a 6-cylinder Continental engine, and its body stampings were made by Budd in Philadelphia.

== Design origin ==
The origins of the Flint can be traced back to the Willys car company, which under the direction of Walter P. Chrysler had been working on a prototype for a proposed 6-cylinder car. Willys had to sell off this prototype as part of its efforts to raise cash during a financial crisis. Once acquired, this prototype was further modified to create the Flint.

== Company demise ==
Following financial troubles at Durant Motors, the Flint was discontinued in 1927. The Flint was priced to compete with Buick, which was also assembled in Flint, Michigan.

== Production model specifications ==
Model	Produced	Cylinders	Performance	Wheelbase	Bodies
E	1923–1924	Straight 6	65 bhp (48 kW)	3048 mm	2 Seat Roadster, 5 Seat Tourer, 2 Door Coupé, 4 Door Limousine
H-40	1925	Straight 6	49 bhp (36 kW)	2921 mm	5 Seat Tourer, 2 Door Sedan
E-55	1925	Straight 6	65 bhp (48 kW)	3048 mm	4 Seat Roadster, 5 Seat Tourer, 2 Door Coupé, 4 Door Limousine
Junior / Junior Z-18	1926–1927	Straight 6	40 bhp (29 kW)	2794 mm	2 Door Sedan
60 / B-60	1926–1927	Straight 6	49 bhp (36 kW)	2921 mm	4 Seat Roadster, 5 Seat Tourer, 4 Door Limousine
80 / E-80	1926–1927	Straight 6	65 bhp (48 kW)	3048 mm	3/4 Seat Roadster, 5 Seat Tourer, 2 Door Coupé, 2/4 Door Limousine

- Flint Six "55" Four Door Brougham

== See also ==
- Durant Motors
