= Flint Six "55" Four Door Brougham =

The Flint Six "55" Four Door Brougham was manufactured by Flint Motors Division of Flint, Michigan.

== Flint Six "55" Four Door Brougham specifications (1926 data) ==
- Color – Optional
- Seating Capacity – Five
- Wheelbase – 120 inches
- Wheels – Artillery
- Tires - 32" x 6.20" balloon
- Service Brakes – Hydraulic, expanding on four wheels
- Emergency Brakes – Contracting on rear
- Engine - Eight-cylinder, vertical, cast en bloc, 3-3/8 x 5 inches; head removable; valves in side; H.P. 27.34 N.A.C.C. rating
- Lubrication – Force feed
- Crankshaft - Seven bearing
- Radiator – Cellular type
- Cooling – Centrifugal pump
- Ignition – Storage Battery
- Starting System – Two Unit
- Voltage – Six to eight
- Wiring System – Single
- Gasoline System – Vacuum
- Clutch – Single plate
- Transmission – Selective sliding
- Gear Changes – 3 forward, 1 reverse
- Drive – Spiral bevel
- Springs – Semi-elliptic
- Rear Axle – Semi-floating
- Steering Gear – Ross cam and lever

=== Standard equipment ===
New car price included the following items:

- tools
- jack
- speedometer
- ammeter
- motometer with lock
- electric horn
- transmission theft lock
- automatic windshield cleaner
- demountable rims
- stop light
- front bumper
- spare tire carrier
- rear-view mirror
- sun visor
- cowl ventilator
- headlight dimmer
- clock
- closed cars have heater and dome light.

=== Optional equipment ===
The following was available at an extra cost:

- extra tire
- tube
- rim
- tire cover
- gasoline gauge on dash

=== Prices ===
New car prices were F.O.B. factory, plus Tax:

- Five Passenger Touring - $1595
- Four Passenger Coupé - $2195
- Five Passenger Sedan - $2285
- Five Passenger Brougham - $2735
- Four Passenger Sport Roadster - $1950

== See also ==
- Flint (automobile)
