= Dominion Motors Frontenac =

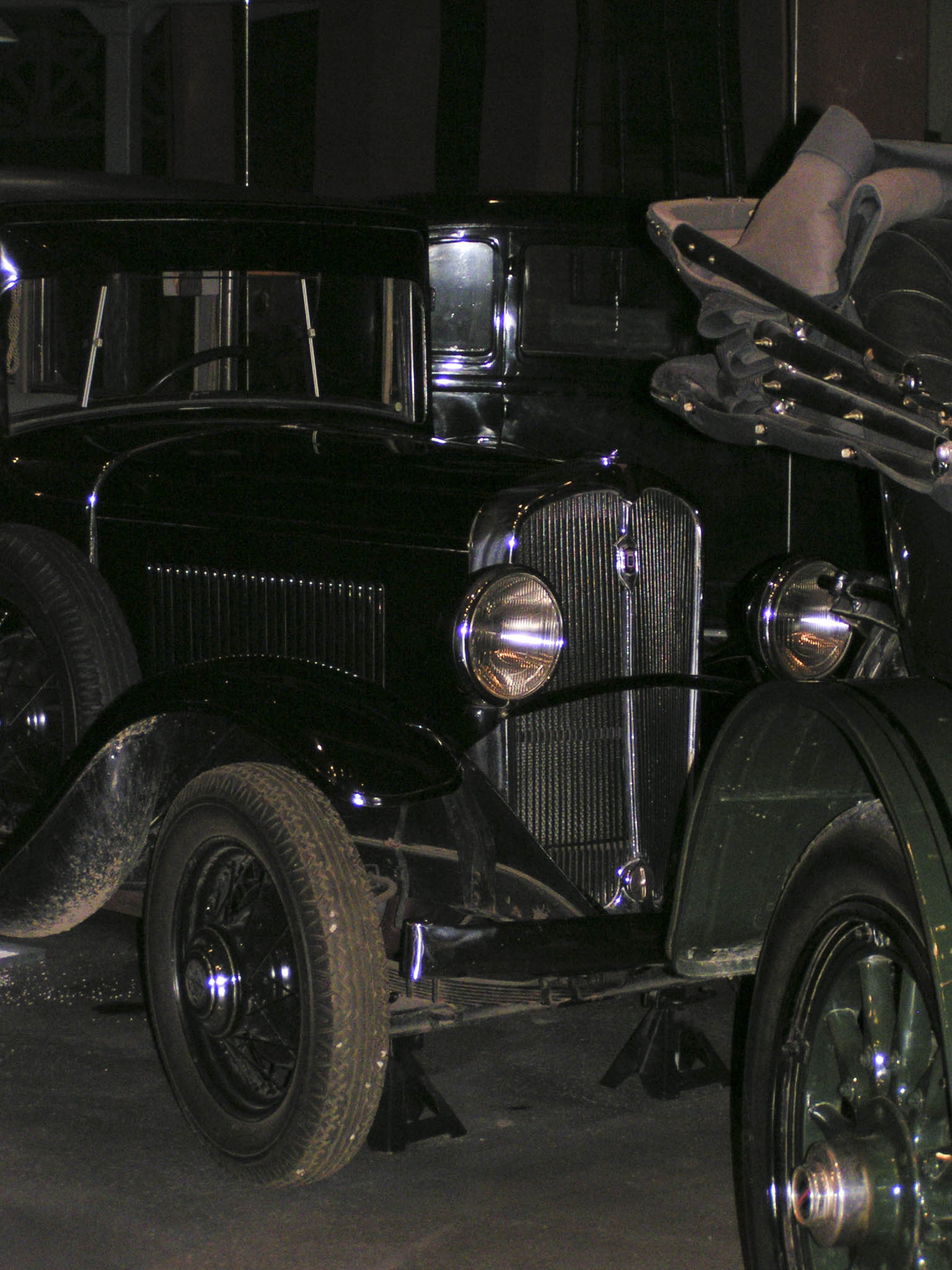
Canadian 1932 Frontenac Deluxe Sedan

Durant Motors of New York, New York, first used the Frontenac marque in 1931 on vehicles built and sold in Canada. The Canadian Durant firm was acquired by a group of Canadian investors Jan 14 1931 (Toronto Star Jan 14 1931) and renamed Dominion Motors Limited. The firm continued building Durant and Frontenac cars. The first Frontenac, for 1931, was model 6-18, a 109-inch-wheelbase car based on the Durant 619.

After Durant Motors went under in 1932, Dominion Motors switched to De Vaux for a source of car designs. The 1932 Frontenac range consisted of two sixes, E 6-70 (109-inch wheelbase), an update of the 1931 E 6-18, and the 6-85 (114-inch wheelbase) based on the De Vaux 6-80.

And just as Durant got into trouble, so did De Vaux. The firm was taken over by its major creditor, Continental Motors, in late 1932. Continental decided to continue car production under the Continental name and Dominion Motors decided to base their cars on Continental vehicles. Just as the 1933 Continental line consisted of three models, so did Frontenac.

The last Frontenac models were the C-400, a 101 1/2-inch-wheelbase four-cylinder car based on the Continental Beacon and the C-600, based on the 107-inch-wheelbase, six-cylinder Continental Flyer. Frontenac imported the 114-inch-wheelbase Continental Ace, putting a Frontenac nameplate on the grille and selling them as the Frontenac Ace.

Although Continental continued into 1934, Frontenac called it quits in 1933. Dominion Motors also built Reo cars and trucks for the Canadian market. Reo continued to use the plant into the early 1950s and in 1950 and 1951 Kaiser used part of the plant to assemble Kaiser sedans for the Canadian market.

Only Dominion carried on and Continental was already out of the picture in 1934 and the majority of the plant was being operated by Reo on its own, 1934 into the 1950s.

Riverdale Tire & Auto Exchange bought up the entire stock from Dominion.

On January 5, 1934, Riverdale Tire & Auto Exchange announced the purchased of Dominion Motors' stock of cars and trucks. A March 12, 1934 advertisement advised 75% of the stock of Dominions was sold, advising the Standard four-cylinder sedan offered a radio.

Dominion Motors Ltd finally sold off their last section of factories and the remaining lands to Frigidaire on June 23, 1944 which ended the only all Canadian owned and operated car co since.

== Sources ==
- Zavitz, Perry R. Canadian Cars, 1946–1984, Bookman Publishing, Baltimore, Maryland, 1985, ISBN 0-934780-43-9
- Canadian Automotive Information Handbook, Canadian Automotive Information Service, Oakville, Ontario, 1939.
