= Durant Motors =

Former automobile manufacturer

Durant Motors, Inc.
- Industry: Automobile
- Founded: 1921
- Founder: William C. Durant
- Defunct: 1931
- Fate: Dissolved
- Products: Vehicles
- Divisions: Durant; Flint; Star/Rugby; Mason Truck
- Subsidiaries: Locomobile Company of America

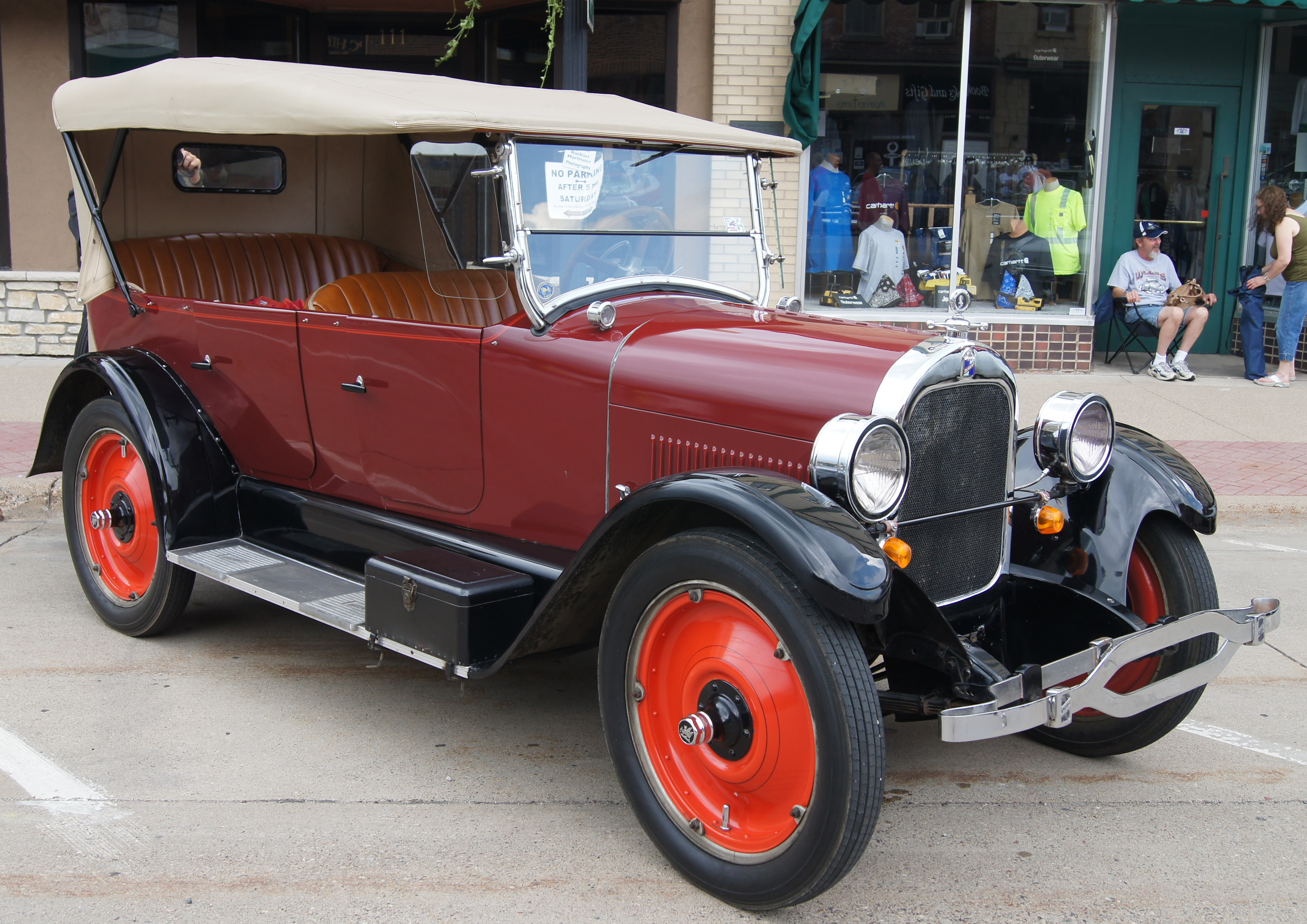
1923 Durant Model A-22 Touring

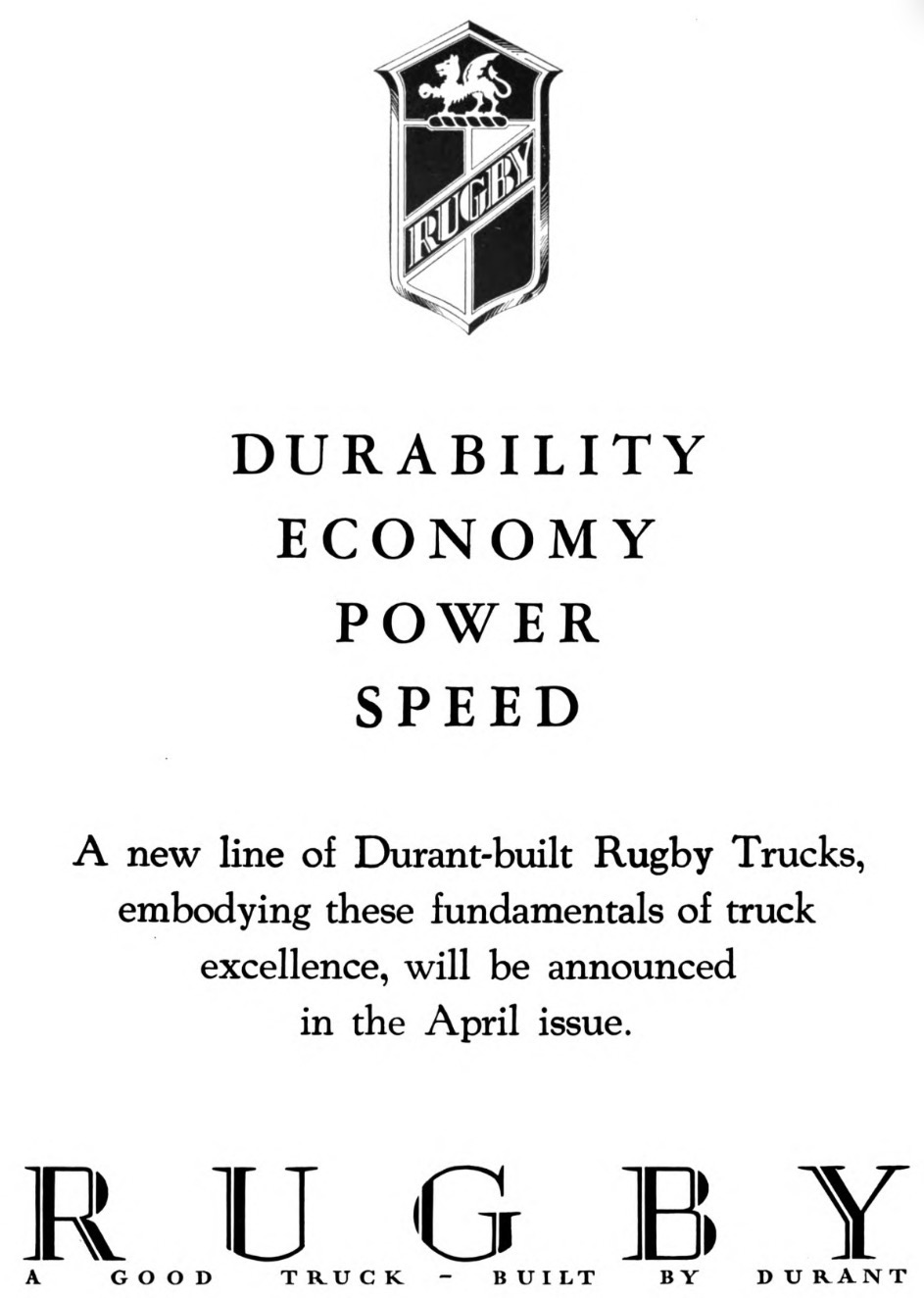
Rugby trucks built by Durant (1928-1931)

Durant Motors was an American multinational automobile manufacturer, previously headquartered in Detroit, Michigan, United States. It was incorporated on January 12, 1921 by William C. Durant, who was the former founder and CEO of General Motors.

The company introduced three automobiles originally, Star, Durant and Flint, but also acquired Locomobile shortly after the initial founding. In addition, Durant Motors added Mason Truck and created a rebadged version of the Star for international markets, called the Rugby. Five production locations were established: Lansing, Michigan; Flint, Michigan; Elizabeth, New Jersey; Oakland, California; and Leaside, Ontario, Canada.

While the company initially amassed good success, slowing sales and poor stock positions up to and subsequently following the 1929 stock market crash caused the company to cease all production in August, 1931. The company went into liquidation in 1933.

== History ==
=== Initial founding and Durant brand ===
William Durant founded Durant Motors on January 12, 1921, which came four months after his resignation from General Motors. After his leave from General Motors, he was able to quickly raise over $5 Million from New York banking friends and colleagues to provide enough capital and planning to start the corporation.

A prototype vehicle was announced in March 1921, designed around a 4-cylinder engine. Durant had brought in Alfred Sturt and Fred Hohnesee to design and develop this prototype. Both men originally worked with Durant in the early days of Chevrolet. The prototype car was displayed in New York City on August 4, 1921, and within days over 30,000 cars were pre-ordered, generating $31 million.

Known as the Model A-22, it scheduled to be produced in the former Goodyear Tire and Rubber Company factory in Long Island City, New York. Shortly after, Durant also purchased the Sheridan plant in Muncie, Indiana from General Motors and did not continue to produce cars under the Sheridan badge. The plant was used to start to manufacture 6-cylinder engine cars.

=== Star Motor Company ===
While at General Motors, Durant helped pioneer the idea of multiple brands within an automotive organization, that served different price points. The idea for the Durant badged automobile gave a middle tier price point offering to the market, but to compete at a lower price point, Durant established the Star Motor Company in February, 1922. This new company had stock placed on sale by the Durant Corporation and became a division. After the initial announcement and listing, $30 million in shares were sold for the Star alone.

With a starting price of $348, the initial vehicle advertised a 4-cylinder motor and 3-speed transmission. It was directly aimed at competing with the Ford Model T. This new vehicle garnered much acclaim due to modern features such as demountable rims and an electric starter.

In June, 1922 at a receivership auction, Durant had purchased the former Willys-Overland plant in Elizabeth, New Jersey. During the transaction, Durant outbid Walter Chrysler as well as General Motors for the plant. This was to be the new production plant for the Star.

=== Flint Motor Car Company ===
Within the purchase of the former Willys-Overland plant in Elizabeth, New Jersey, was a large developmental 6-cylinder prototype vehicle. In July 1922, Durant announced the formation of the Flint Motor Car Company, and used the 6-cylinder vehicle as the prototype, called the "Flint Six". Production of the vehicle started in a factory, located on a 100-acre property south of downtown Flint, Michigan (a longtime favorite city of Durant's). This vehicle was marketed as a competitor to Buick. Production of the Flint Six Model E-55 began June 1923.

=== Locomobile Company of America ===
In July 1922, Durant acquired the established luxury-car brand Locomobile. The company was struggling financially and underwent liquidation sale to Durant, who restructured the offerings to reduce the vehicle costs and increase production volume. This acquisition put Durant Motors under a similar organization to General Motors, with Locomobile being at the high price point in order to compete with Cadillac.

=== Additional brands and initial success ===
In the winter of 1922, Durant co-founded a truck-making subsidiary, Mason Truck Company, with Arthur C. Mason. Mason had originally established Mason Motors in 1911 and Durant was familiar with him and his company from his former time at Buick and Chevrolet (both of which used these motor designs). When deciding to venture into commercial truck market, Durant made a partnership with Mason and established a factory in Flint, Michigan, giving control of operations to Arthur. The Mason Truck "Road King" nameplate was established in 1923 and offered 1-ton and 1.5 ton trucks.

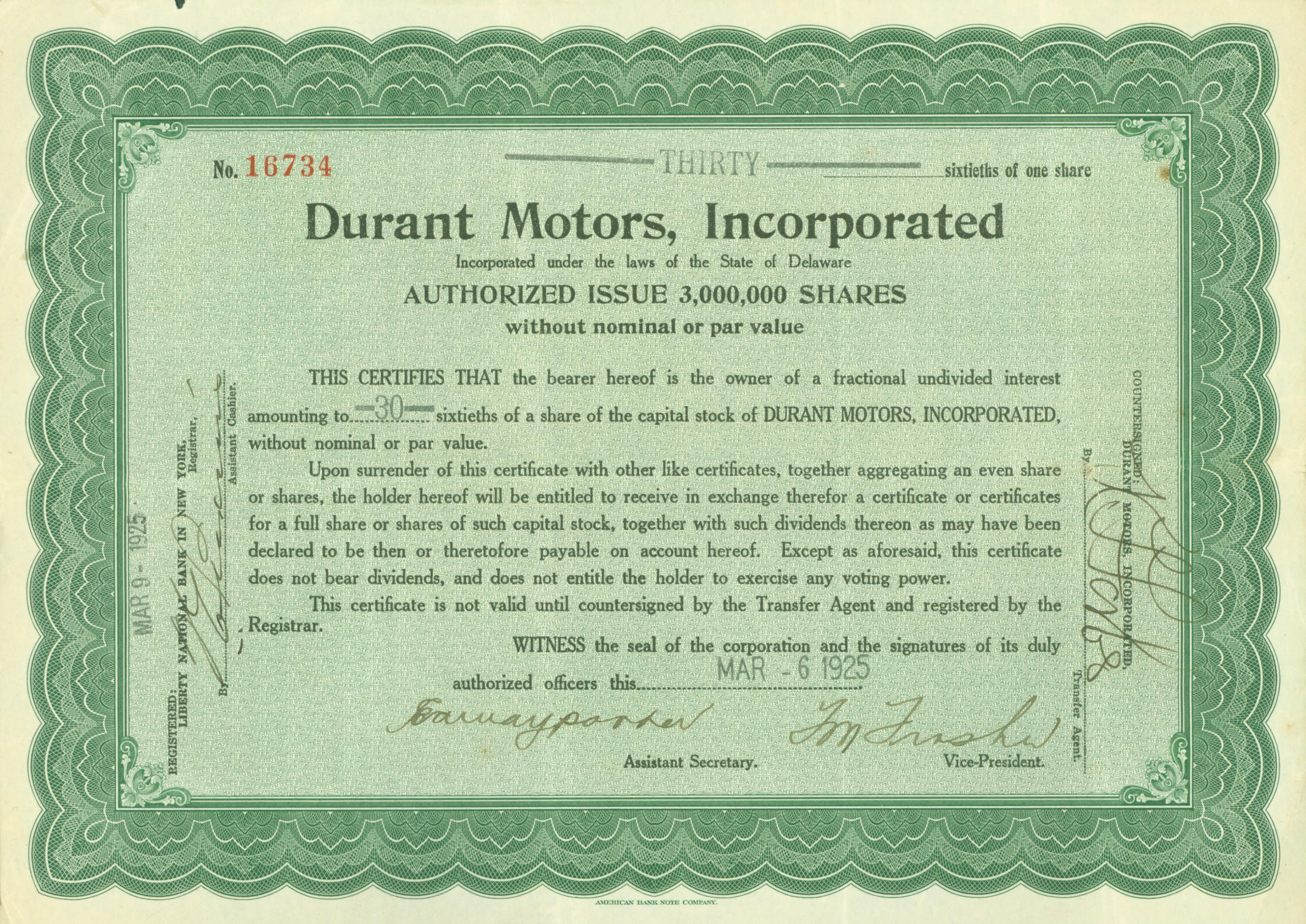
Share of the Durant Motors, Inc., issued 6 March 1925

In November 1922, Durant also acquired the Hayes Hunt Body Company (located in the Elizabeth, New Jersey factory), the American Plate Glass Company, the New Process Gear Company and the Electric Auto-Lite Company. These companies became critical pieces of the organization and gave Durant specific production capabilities. In 1923 Durant Motors produced its 100,000th "Star" auto at Elizabeth.

By summer of 1923, less than two years from initial founding, the company had 50,000 employees across 10 factories, with 4,000 dealers across the United States. Reports in 1926 indicated that sales of the Star increased by 69 percent from the previous year.

The Princeton, a brand aimed to be an equivalent to a Packard was planned and announced, but never realized beyond two display prototypes created in 1924.

The Eagle was announced in January 1924 at the New York Auto Show. Durant Motors showcased a new prototype vehicle for this new brand. Apart from this showing, the final vehicle never got designed and produced.

=== Late 1920s to ending operations ===
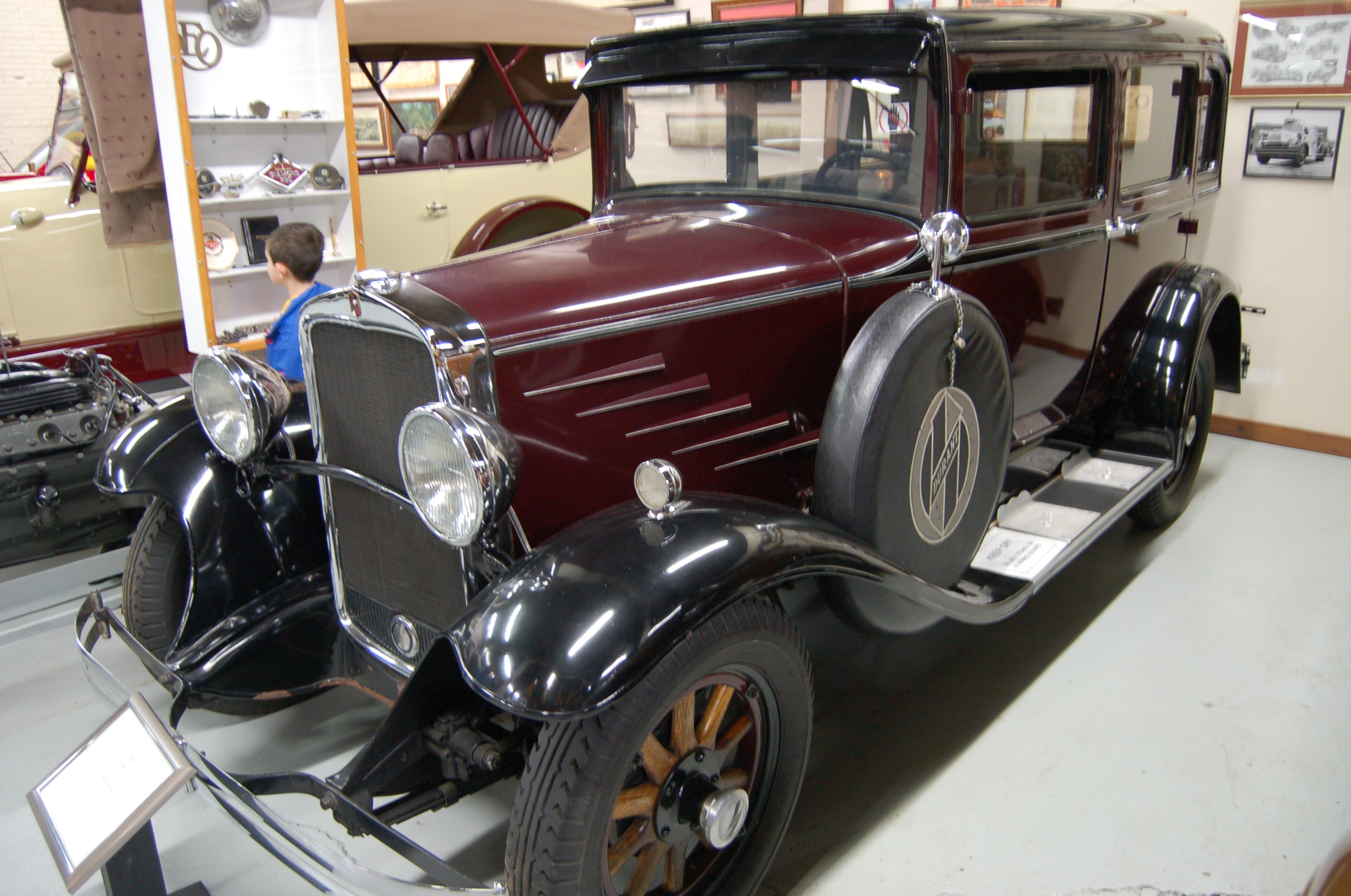
1930 Durant sedan

Initially, Durant Motors enjoyed success based upon Billy Durant's track record at General Motors, where he assembled independent makes Chevrolet, Oakland, Oldsmobile, Buick, and Cadillac. However, when sales failed to meet volumes sufficient to sustain Durant Motors holdings, the firm's financial footing began to slip. As a result, Durant Motors began losing market share and dealers.

In 1927, the Durant line was shut down to retool for a brand-new, modernized car for 1928, re-emerging in 1928 with Durant, Locomobile, and Rugby lines in place, and dropping the Mason Truck and Flint automobile lines and the top-selling Star car in April 1928.

In 1929, Locomobile went out of production.

Durant Motors had a relationship with the Dort, Frontenac, and DeVaux automobile name badges. The Rugby line was the export name for Durant's Star car line. However, from 1928 to 1931, Durant marketed trucks in the US and Canadian markets under the badge Rugby Trucks.

The final Durant-branded models rolled off the US assembly line in August 1931 at Lansing, but continued in Canada into 1932 under Dominion Motors, which also built the Frontenac.

Billy Durant died nearly broke at age 85 in 1947 (the same year as Henry Ford, aged 83).

== Manufacturing plants ==
Over the course of production, 5 manufacturing plants were established for the Durant Motors organization: Lansing, Michigan; Flint, Michigan; Elizabeth, New Jersey; Oakland, California; and Leaside, Ontario, Canada.

=== Coach-builders ===
The coachwork of Durant Motors was outsourced to a number coachbuilding companies, depending on the region and contracts at the time with Durant. A number of companies were bought by or partnered with Durant during this time, where he owned equity in these companies.

Some companies building bodies for Durant included:

- Locke & Co. (Detroit, Michigan)
- Associated Bodies Corp. (Louisville, Kentucky)
- The Wilson Motor Bodies Ltd. (Toronto, Ontario)
- Canadian Top & Body Ltd. (Tilbury, Ontario)
- Blue Ribbon Body Corp. for Locomobile (Bridgeport, Connecticut)
- Auto Body Co. (Lansing, Michigan)
- Hayes-Hunt Corp. (Elizabeth, New Jersey)
- Merrimac Body Co. (Merrimac, Massachusetts)
- Murray Body Corp. (Detroit, Michigan)
- Edward G. Budd Mfg. Co. (Troy, Michigan)

=== Subsequent plant history ===
The Lansing, Michigan, Durant plant on Verlinden Avenue opened in 1920. After the demise of Durant, it remained closed until GM purchased it in 1935. It restarted production for GM's Fisher Body Division, later becoming the Buick-Oldsmobile-Cadillac factory. It was finally combined with another Lansing plant to become Lansing Car Assembly. That factory was closed on May 6, 2005, and demolished in 2007.

Durant's Flint, Michigan, factory was bought by the Fisher Body Division of General Motors, and built mostly Buick bodies until its 1987 closure. The main administration building is still surviving, but sits abandoned.

Durant's Oakland, California, plant, located at the northeast corner of East 14th Street (now International Blvd.) and Durant Avenue (also the boundary between Oakland and San Leandro), later became a General Motors parts warehouse. Part of the plant survives as loft apartments and the Durant Square shopping center.

The company's Canadian Leaside, Ontario, plant later became a factory for the Canadian Wire and Cable Company. While a large portion of the factory was demolished for a shopping centre, the main headquarters building constructed in 1928 remains and was designated a heritage property by the City of Toronto in 2020.

Durant's former plant in Elizabeth, New Jersey, housed one of the first supermarkets in the 1930s, and then was used as a cookie bakery by Burry Biscuits for many years. It was in use as a warehouse when it was destroyed by fire in December 2011.

== Enthusiast organization ==
The Durant Motors Automobile Club was founded in 1998 as a non-profit organization dedicated to educate the public and preserve the legacy of Durant Motors and its various brands. The club hosts meets and driving tours, as well as offering a place for technical information to be shared for members who preserve and restore Durant vehicles. The club also maintains a registry of the remaining existing vehicles, which traces its original creation back to 1975.

== See also ==
- Flint (automobile)
- Rugby (automobile)
- Star (automobile)
- Mason Truck
- List of defunct United States automobile manufacturers
