= Durant (automobile) =

Defunct American motor vehicle manufacturer

- Company type: Division
- Industry: Automotive
- Founded: 1921; 105 years ago
- Founder: William C. Durant
- Defunct: 1931; 95 years ago in United States; 1932; 94 years ago in Canada
- Fate: Dissolved
- Headquarters: Lansing, Michigan, U.S.
- Area served: North America
- Parent: Durant Motors

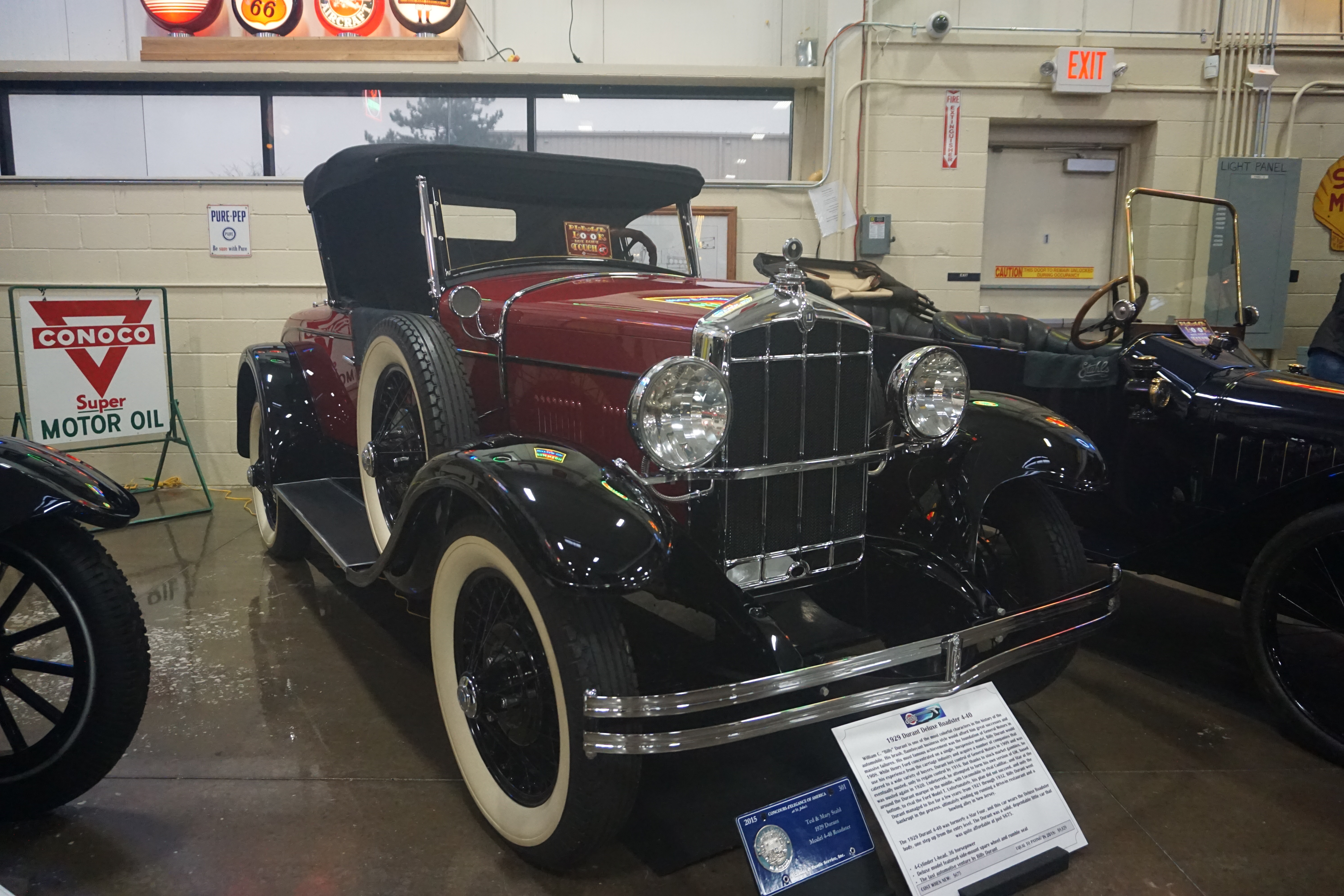
1929 Durant Deluxe Roadster 4-40 at Stahls Automotive Collection

The Durant was a make of automobile assembled by Durant Motors Corporation of New York City, New York from 1921 to 1926 and again from 1928 to 1932. Durant Motors was founded by William "Billy" Durant after he was terminated, for the second and final time, as the head of General Motors. Billy Durant's intent was to build an automotive empire that could one day challenge General Motors.

The Durant automobile is considered to be an example of an "assembled" automobile because so many of its components were obtained from outside suppliers. From 1921 to 1926 the vehicle was powered by a four cylinder Durant own overhead or 6 cyl overhead Anstead . The vehicle was directed at the Oakland automobile price point.

Production of the vehicle was suspended for 1927. When the Durant was reintroduced April 1928, the car was redesigned and powered by a six cylinder Continental engine; some of the early vehicles were marketed as the "Durant-Star". Bodies for the vehicle were supplied by Budd Company. In 1930, some Durants were built with all steel bodies, also supplied by Budd.

Durant Motors was found insolvent and automobile production ended early in 1932.

== Production models ==
Model	Model Year		Engine Size	Description
Model	Introduced	Last Year	Engine Size	Description
Durant
A-22	1921	1926	4 Cylinder, 35 hp	
B-22	1922	1924	6 cylinder, 70 hp	
No production in 1927
M2	April 1928	September 1928	4 cylinder	Replaced the Star M2 after Star production was shut down in April, 1928.
M4	September 1928	1928	4 cylinder	Replaced with 40 model.
55	1928	1928	6 cylinder	Replaced the Star Model R.
4-40	1929	1929	4 cylinder, 36 hp	
6-60	1928	1929	6 cylinder	Series 1 Oct to Dec 1928, series 2 Jan to Dec 1929
6-63	1929	1929	6 cylinder	Same engine size as Model 6-60 with a higher compression head.
6-65	1928	1929	6 cylinder	
6-66	1929	1929	6 cylinder	
6-70	1929	1929	6 cylinder	
6-75	1928	1929	6 cylinder	
407	1930	1932	4 cylinder	Made at Oakland to Oct 1930, Dominion Motors of Canada continued to make this model in 1932.
610	1930	1931	6 cylinder	
611	1931	1931	6 cylinder	Dominion Motors only.
612	1930	1931	6 cylinder	
614	1930	1932	6 cylinder	While Durant Motors in the United States went out of production Aug 1931, Dominion Motors of Canada continued to make this model in 1932.
617	1930	1930	6 cylinder	
618	1931	1932	6 cylinder	Dominion Motors of Canada only.
619	1931	1931	6 cylinder	
