= List of American truck manufacturers =

This is a list of American truck manufacturers.

== 0-9 ==
- 4 Guys, Inc

== A ==
- A.B.C. Motor Vehicle Company(1905–1911)
- Abbot-Downing Truck and Body Company (1912-1925)
- Abendroth & Root (1906–1912), A&R (1912–1915)
- Abresch-Cramer Auto Truck Company (1910_1912)
- Acason Motor Truck Company (1915–1925)
- Ace (1918–1927)
- ACF (1899-), ACF-Brill (1925–1953)
- Acme Motor Truck Company (1915–1931)
- Acme Road Machinery Company (1930)
- Acorn (1910–1912)
- Acorn Motor Truck Company (1924-1931)Acorn
- Adams Brothers Manufacturing Company (1910–1916)
- Admiral (1913-1915)
- Advance-Rumely [trucks] (1919-1928)
- AGCO (1990-)
- Ahrens-Fox (1911–1935) (later LeBlond-Schacht)
- Ajax (1920–1922) (Not to be confused with the Ajax Motor Co.)
- Air-O-Flex (1917-1920)
- Akron (1913-1914)
- Akron-Multi-Truck (1920-1921)
- ALCO (1905–1913)
- Alden Sampson (1903–1913)
- Alena Steam (1922-1923) Alena Steam Products Company
- Alexis Fire Equipment Company (fire trucks, 1947–present)
- Alkane
- All-American Truck Company (1918–1922)
- All-Power (1918-1920)
- Allianz
- Allis-Chalmers (1913- )
- Alter (1912–1917)
- AM General
- American Motor Truck Company (1906–1911) American
- American (1911–1913)
- American (1913–1918)
- American Austin (1929–1934)
- American Bantam (1935–1941)
- American Coleman (1925–1986)
- American Coulthard (1905–1906)
- American Eagle (1911-1912)
- American LaFrance
- American Motor Vehicle Company "Dumore" (1916-1920)
- American Red Ball (1919-)
- American Steam Wagon (1903)
- American Steamer (1922–1924)
- American Truck Company (2003–2007) (rebadged Tatras)
- American & British Manufacturing Corporation (fire trucks, 1905–1925) American & British Manufacturing Corporation
- Amoskeag (1872–1906)
- Anderson Carriage Mfg. Co. (1910)
- Anderson Electric Car Company (1911-1913) Detroit
- Ann Arbor (1909–1917)
- Apex (1917–1921)
- Appleton (1917-1927) Appleton Motor Truck Company
- Argo (1910–1916)
- Armleder & Company (1910–1928)
- Army Quartermaster Depot (1928–1930)
- Artzberger Automobile Company (1904) Artzberger Automobile Company
- Associated Motor Industries (1922-1924)
- Atco American Truck&Tractor (1920-1924)
- Athey
- Atlantic Trucks (1912–1921)
- Atlas [Knox] (1905–1913)
- Atlas [Martin] (1909–1923)
- Atterbury (1910–1935)
- Auburn Motor Chassis Company (1911–1916)
- Auglaize Motor Car Co. (1911–1916)
- Aultman (1901-1905)
- Autocar (1897-)
- Auto-Dynamic (1900-1905)
- Automatic Transportation Company (1921-1927)
- Automotor Company (1910–1912)
- Available (1910–1957)
- Avery (1891–1928) Trucks from (1910–1923)

== B ==
- BAE Systems
- Babcock (1912) Babcock
- Backus Motor Truck Company (1925–1937)
- Bailey (1912-)
- Baker (1908–1915)
- Baldwin Steamer (1896)
- Balqon (2008-today) Balqon
- Barber Motor Truck Corporation (1917–1918)
- Barker C.L. (1912–1917)
- Barker (1911-1913) Los Angeles
- Barley
- Barrows (1927–1928)
- Bauer machine works Co. (1914)
- Beardsley Electric (1915)
- Beaver (1914–1915)
- Beaver (1935–1953)
- Beck (1911–1921)
- Beck (1934–1957)
- Beech Creek
- Bell (1919–1923)
- Belmont (1918–1922)
- Bergdoll (1912)
- Bering
- Best (1910–1914))
- Bessemer (1911–1926)
- Bethlehem (1917–1926)
- Betz
- Beyster-Detroit (1910–1911)
- Bickle (1923–1984)
- Biddle-Murray (1905–1907)
- Biederman (1920–1955)
- Binghamton Electric (1920)
- Black-Crow (1910–1912)
- Blacker & Co. (1912)
- Blair (1911–1918)
- Board (1911–1912)
- Bollstrom
- Borland (1911–1914)
- Bourne (1915–1919)
- Bowling Green Motor Car Co. (1914)
- Boyd (1912)
- Brinton Motor Truck Company (1913–1924)
- Briscoe
- Bristol (1909)
- Brockway (1912–1977)
- Brodesser (1909–1911)
- Brooks (1912)
- Brown Commercial Car (1912-1914)
- Brown (1939–1953)
- Brush (1908–1912)
- Bryan (1918–1923)
- Buckeye (1912)
- Buckmobile (1902-1905)
- Buda
- Buffalo (1899–1906)
- Buffalo (1921–1948)
- Buick
- Burford (1915-)
- Butler (1913–1914) Huselton Automobile Company
- BYD (garbage trucks) (different models in USA)
- Byron (1912)

== C ==
- Cadillac Cadillac Commercial Wagon
- Cameron
- Capacity
- Capitol
- Carlson Motor and Truck Company (1904–1910)
- Case
- Cass (1910–1914)
- Cartercar (1910-?)
- Caterpillar (1925-)
- CCC (1953–2013)
- Cedar Rapids automobile works (1910-?) formerly Beck & Son
- Champion
- Champion Wagon Co. (1904)
- Chase (1907–1919)
- Chevrolet
- Chicago Comercial Auto MFG. Co. (1905)
- Chicago Motor Truck
- Chicago Motor Vehicle Co. (1902-1903)
- Chicago Pneumatic Tool Co. (1914)
- Christie (1911–1918)
- Chrysler
- Clark
- Clark Steam Automobiles (1895-1912) Edward S. Clark Steam Automobiles
- Cletrac (1923–1965)
- Cline (1952–1972)
- Clinton (1920–1934)
- Clydesdale Motor Truck Company (1917–1939), formerly Clyde Cars Company
- Coleman Carge & Har. Co. (1914)
- Coleman Motors Corp. (1925–1949)
- Colet
- Collier
- Columbia Motor Truck Company (1916–1925)
- Comet
- Commerce Motor Truck Company
- Commercial Motor Car (1908-?)
- Commercial Motor Truck Company (1906–1909)
- Commercial Truck Company of America
- Commonwealth Edison Company (1908-?)
- Concord (1916-1933)
- CONDEC (1955-)
- Conestoga (1917-1920)
- Conrad Motor Carriage Co. (1903)
- Continental (1912–1918)
- Continental Motors (De Vaux) (1934–1935)
- Cook (1950–1964)
- Coppock (1907–1909)
- Corbitt (1899–1954)
- Corliss
- Couple-Gear (1904–1922)
- Crane Carrier(CCC) (1946–2021)
- Cross (1914–1916)
- Crown Commercial Car Co. (1910-1915)
- Crown (1918-2001)
- C-T-Electric Commercial Truck Company

== D ==
- Dain (1912)
- Darby (1910)
- Dart (1903–1988)
- Davis
- Day-Elder Motors Corporation (1921–1937)
- Dayton
- Dearborn (1919–1924)
- Decatur (1911–1912)
- Defiance-Century Motor Truck Company
- Delling Motors Company Delling Motors Company
- Dempster
- Denby Motor Truck Company
- Denniston (1911–1912)
- Dependable
- Desberon (1901–1904)
- Deschaum (1909)
- DeKalb (1914–1918)
- DeMartini (1915–1949)
- De Motte Motor Car Company (1904)
- DeSoto (fire trucks)
- Detroit Electric (1909–1927)
- Detroit Anderson Electric (1911–1912)
- Detroit-Wyandotte Motor Co. (1914)
- Diamond Reo (1967–1995)
- Diamond T (1911–1966)
- Diehl (1918–1926)
- Differential (1931–1970)
- Dispatch
- Divco
- Doane (1916–1948)
- Dodge
- Dominion (1915-1917)
- Dorris (1906–1926)
- Dort (1921–1924)
- Douglas (1918–1935)
- Dowagiac (1909)
- Downing cycle car Co. (1914)
- Douglas
- Dresser (1984-)
- Driggs-Seabury Ordnance Co. (1914)
- Duer (1910)
- Duntley (1910-1912)
- Drummond (1917–1935)
- Duplex (1908–1955)
- Durable (1912-1917)
- Durant Motors (1921-1931)
- Durant-Dort Carriage Co. (1914)
- Duryea
- Duty Motor (1920-1922)
- Dyke (1899–1904)
- Dynamic (1911–1912)

== E ==
- E-One
- Eagle (1925-1930)
- Eagle Motor Car Company (1904-1908)
- Eagle Motor Company (1914-1915) Eagle Motor Company
- Earl (automobile) (1921-1923)
- Eaton-Fuller ; Fuller Power Truck (1909–1917)
- Eclipse (1911-1913)
- Economy (1908–1912) Economy Motor Car Company
- Economycar (1914) Economycar
- Edison Motors
- Elbert Motor Car Company (1914-1915) Elbert Motor Car Company
- Eldridge (1913-)
- Electric Carriage & Wagon Company (1896-1897) Electric Carriage & Wagon Company
- Electric Vehicle Company (1903-1905)
- Elgin (1916-1924)
- Ellsworth (1916-1920)
- Elmira (1916-1921)
- Elwell-Parker (1893- )
- Elk (1913–1914)
- Elkhart Motor Truck Company (1918-1931)
- Envirotech
- Epperson (1912-1913)
- Erie (1914-1922)
- Erie Motor Car Company (1916-1919) Erie Motor Car Company
- Euclid (1926-2004)
- Eugol (1922-1923)
- Eureka Company (1871-1964) Eureka Company
- Eureka Motor Car Manufacturing Company (1907-1909) Eureka Motor Car Manufacturing Company
- Evans (1912-1913)
- Evo (1953-)
- Ewing (1912)
- Ewing (1909–1911)

== F ==
- Facto (1922)
- Fageol Motors (1916–1938; later Peterbilt)
- Fairbanks-Morse (~1908-1910)
- Falcon (1915-1916)
- Famous (1917-1919)
- Fargo (1913-1978)
- Farm-a-Truck (1916-)
- Farmer-Mobile (1907-1909)
- Farrar Fire Apparatus (1933–1987)
- Fawick (1913-1916)
- F.C.S. Schmidt (1909–1911)
- Federal (1910–1960)
- Fifth Avenue Coach (1916-1925) later Yellow Coach
- Fisher by Standard Motor Truck
- Fischer (1901-1905) Hoboken
- Fixible (1924–1996) later Grumman-Fixible
- Flanders Automobile Company (1910–1913)
- Flint (1914-1915)
- Fool-Proof-Ideal (1912)
- Ford
- Forschler (1914–1922)
- Fort-Wayne (1911–1912)
- Four Traction Automobile Company (1908-1913) Four Traction
- Fournier-Searchmont (1900-1903)
- Franklin (automobile) (1902–1934)
- Frayer-Miller (1904–1910)
- Freeman (1928–1934)
- Freightliner (1942-)
- Fremont-Mais (1914-1915) later Burford
- Fremont (1919–1924)
- Frisbee (1922-1923)
- Fritschle (1912-)
- Frontenac (1906-1912)
- Fruehauf (1938)
- F.S. Motors (1912)
- Fuller Buggy Co. (1911)
- Fulton (1908–1925)
- FWD (1909–2003)

== G ==
- Gabriel (1910–1920) Gabriel Auto Company
- Gaeth Automobil Works (1902-1910)
- Garford (1909–1980)
- Garwood
- Gar Wood (1936-1938)
- Gary (1916–1927) Gary Motor Corporation
- Gay (1913-1915)
- Gaylord Motor Car Co. (1912)
- General Industrial Mfg. Co. (1912)
- General Vehicle (or G.V.) (1907–1920)
- Geneva (1912-1919)
- Gersix (1915–1922)
- Giant (1918-1922)
- Gifford-Petit (1907-1908)
- Gilson (1921–1988)
- Gleason-Bauer (1912)
- Glide Bartholomew Co. (1911-1912)
- Global
- Globe (1916–1919)
- Glover Geo. S. (1911-1912)
- GMC (1912–present)
- Golden West - Robinson (1913-1920)
- Gopher (1911-1912)
- Goodyear (1920–1926)
- Gotfredson (1920–1948)
- Grabowsky (1908–1913)
- Graham-Paige (1927-1962)
- Gramm-Bernstein (1912–1930)
- Gramm Motor Car Co. (1910)
- Gramm-Kincaid (1925–1942)
- Gramm - Logan (1908-1910)
- Gramm Storage Co. (1903–1913)
- Gramm Motor Truck Corporation (1926–1942)
- Grant (1918–1923)
- Grant-Ferris (1901)
- Grass-Premier (1923–1937)
- Gray (1923-1925)
- Gray's (1911)
- Great Southern (1915-1917)
- Greenville {Omort} (1928)
- Greyhound (1914-)
- Guilder (1924-1936)
- G.V. Mercedes (1913–1918)
- GWW (?-1923-?)

== H ==
- Hackney (1947-)
- Hahn (1907–1933)
- Hal-Fur (1919–1931)
- Hall (1915–1922)
- Halsey (1901–1907) Steam
- Handy Wagon (1911-1916)
- Hanger (1915-1916)
- Harder (1910-1913)
- Harders Fire Proof Storage & Van Co. (1911–1912)
- Harrison (1911-1917)
- Hart-Kraft (1907–1913)
- Hart-Parr (1901–1929)
- Harsco
- Harwood Barley Mfg Co. (1914)
- Harvey (1911–1932)
- Hatfield (1910–1911)
- Hawkeye (1917–1933)
- Hayes (1922–1975)
- Hebb (before 1926)
- Hebb Motors (1919-?)
- Heil (1901-)
- Hendrickson (1913-1978)
- Henry Lee Power Co. (1912)
- Hercules (1913-1915)
- Hewitt (1905–1914)
- Hewitt-Lindstrom (1900–1902)
- Highway (1960-)
- Highway-Knight (1919-1921)
- Higrade (1917-1921)
- Hinde & Dauch (1906–1908)
- HME (1913-)
- Hoffman (1913-1914)
- Holmes Motor Co. (1920-)
- Holsman Automobile Company (1901–1910)
- Horner (1913–1918)
- Hoover (1917-1920)
- Houghton (1915-1917)
- Howard (1915-1916)
- Huber (1903-1907)
- Hudson (~1937-1939)
- Huffman (1919–1931)
- The Hug Company (1921–1942)
- Hummer
- Huntington (1912)
- Hupmobile
- Hurlburt (1912–1927) Hurlburt Motor Truck Company

== I ==
- Ibex (1964-)
- Imperium
- Ideal (1911–1916)Ideal Auto Company
- Independent (Ohio) (1918-1923)
- Independent (Iowa) (1917-1921)
- Indiana (1910–1939)
- Inland (1919-1920)
- Interboro (1913-1914)
- International (1902-1985)
- International (1908) Philadelphia
- International Power Company (1899–1902)
- Inter-State (1916-1917)
- Iowa Motor Truck Co. (1919–1923)
- Isco (1972-)
- Ivey

== J ==
- Jackson (1903-1923)
- Jaguar
- Jamieson (1901-1902)
- Jarrett (1921-1934)
- Jarvis-Huntington (1911-1914)
- Jatco (Joliet Auto Tire Co.) (1912-)
- Jeep
- Jeffery (1914-1917)
- Jones
- Johnson (1901-1912)
- Jonz (1908–1912)
- Jumbo (1918-1924)
- Juno (1912-1914)

== K ==
- Kadix (1912-1913)
- Kaiser (1945–1953)
- Kaiser-Frazer (1945-1953)
- Kaiser-Jeep
- Kalamazoo (1919-1923)
- Kalmar
- Kanawha (1911-1912)
- Kankakee
- Kansas City Vehicle Co. (1905-1917)
- Karavan (1920-1921)
- Karbach & Sons (1901)
- Kearns (1908-1928)
- Keldon
- Kelland Electric (1922–1925)
- Kelly-Springfield (1910–1927)
- Kentucky Wagon Works (1914–1923)
- Kenworth (1923–present)
- Keystone (1919–1923)
- Kimball (1917-1926)
- Kimble
- King (1912-1918)
- King-Zeitler KZ (1919-1929)
- Kissel (1910–1930)
- Kleiber (1913–1937)
- Klemm
- Kline (1909–1914)
- Klondike (1920-1929)
- KME Fire Apparatus (1946–present)
- Knickerbocker (1915–1917)
- Knox (1900–1915)
- Koehler (1910–1923)
- Kohlmeyer, F.W. (1920–1929)
- Kopp (1911–1916)
- Kosmath (1914-1916)
- Kratzer
- Kuhn
- Krebs Commercial Car Company (1912–1917)
- Krebs/Buck (1922-1927)

== L ==
- LaFrance-Republic (1929–1942)
- Lambert (1906-1918)
- Lamson (1911-1919)
- Landshaft (1911-1920)
- Lane (1916-1920)
- Lange Motor Truck (1911–1931)
- Lanpher (1910)
- Lansden (1906-)
- Lapeer (1916-1920)
- Lauth Juergens (1907–1915)
- Larrabee-Deyo Motor Truck Company (1915–1932)
- Law (1912-1913)
- Lawson (1917-1918)
- Leblond-Schacht (1927-1942)
- Lectra Hault (1935-)
- Lehigh (1925–1927)
- LeMoon (1910–1939)
- Lewis (1912–1914)
- Liberty Trucks (1917-1918) (divers)
- Light (1913-1914)
- Lincoln
- Lincoln (1910-1914) former Sears Motor Car Works
- Lincoln Motor Truck Company (1916-1917)
- Lindsley (1908-1909)
- Linn (1916–1950)
- Lion (garbage trucks)
- Lippard-Stewart (1911-1919)
- Little Giant (1912-1918)
- Locomobile (1912-1916)
- Logan (1903-1908)
- Lombard
- Lone Star (1922)
- Loomis Auto Car Company (1900-1904) Loomis Auto Car Company
- Lord (1912-)
- Louisiana Motor Car L.M.C.
- Little Giant (1912-1918)
- L.M.C. (1919-1920)
- Lodal (garbage trucks and fire trucks)
- Longest (1910-1916)
- Lord Baltimore (1911-1916)
- Loomis (1899-?)
- Loyal (1918-1920)
- Lozier (1910-1912)
- Luck Utility (1913-1914)
- Luedinghaus (1920–1933)
- Luitwieler Pumping Engine Company (1910)
- Luverne (1912–1923)

== M ==
- Maccar (1914–1935)
- Mack (1900-)
- MacDonald (1920–1949) later Peterbilt
- Mackbilt (1917)
- Maibohm (1916-1922)
- Mais (1911-1916)
- Manhattan by Mack Bros (1907–1910)
- Manitowoc (1902-) Speedcranes
- Manly (1917–1920)
- Marathon (1912-1913) Nashville
- Marathon (1969-)
- Marion (garbage trucks)
- Marmon (1912-1915) Indianapolis
- Marmon (1963–1997)
- Marmon-Herrington (1931)
- Marquette (1910-1912)
- Martin (1910–1912)
- Mason (1912) later Maytag
- Master (1917–1929)
- Max (1988-)
- Maxfer (1917-1919)
- Maxim Munitions Corporation (?-1918-?)
- Maxim Motors (1914-1989)
- Maxim by Bushnell (1911-1914) similar to Phänomobil
- Maxwell (1905–1925)
- McCormick
- McNeilus
- McIntyre (1909–1912)
- M & E (1913-1915)
- Meiselbach (1906–1912)
- Menominee (1911–1937) Clintonville
- Menominee (1916-1918) Menominee
- C.F. Megow (1910-?)
- Mercury (1910-1917)
- Merit (1911)
- Metropolitan Motors (1917- )
- Metz (1916-1917)
- Midland
- Milburn (1922)
- Militor (1917-1918) {Latil}
- Miller (1906) Bridgeport
- Miller (1913-1914) Detroit
- Milwaukee Automobile Company (1899-1902)
- Minneapolis (1912-1913) Threewheeler
- Minneapolis (1918-1929)
- Minneapolis-Moline (1939–1948)
- Mission (1914)
- Mitchell (1905-1908) Racine
- Mitchell (1906) Philadelphia
- Mobile Company of America (1899-1903)
- Modern (1911-1912) St.Louis
- Modern Trucks (1911-1919) Bowling Green
- Moeller (1910-1914)
- Mogul (1911–1913 in Chicago) (1914–1916 in St.Louis)
- Moline (1920-1923)
- Monitor (1910-1916)
- Moon (1912-1917)
- Moore (1911-1916) California
- Moore (1912-1914) Philadelphia
- Moore (1913-1914) Syracuse
- Mora (1911-1914)
- Moreland (1911–1940)
- Morgan (1902–1912)
- Morrison (1888–1895)
- Morton (1912-1916)
- Motiv
- Motokart (1913-1914)
- Motorette (1911-1912)
- Muskegon (1917-1920)
- Mutual (1919-1921)
- Myers (1918-1919)
- M & P Electric Vehicle Co. (1912-)

== N ==
- Napoleon (1916-1923)
- Nash Motors (1916–1954)
- Natco (1912-1916)
- National
- Navistar International (1986–present)
- Nelson Motor Truck Company (1918-1924)
- Nelson & Le Moon
- Netco (1914–1938)
- Neustadt (1911-1914) Neustadt-Perry Company
- Nevada (1913-1916)
- Newark (1911-1912)
- New England (1899-1901) New England
- New Era (1911-1912)
- New Haven Truck (Moeller) (1912-)
- New Winona Manufacturing Company (1901-1909) New Winona Manufacturing Company
- New York (1913–1921) (Tegetmeier & Riepe N.Y.)
- New York (1912) Nutley
- Nikola (2016–present)
- Niles (1917-1920) (Ohio)
- Niles (Pennsylvania)
- Noble (1917–1931)
- Northern (1906–1908)
- Northway (1912–1926) (Formerly Ohio Motor Car, Crescent)
- Northwestern (1913-1923)
- Norwalk (1918-1919)
- Nott Company (W.S. Nott Company) (1879-1939)
- Nyberg (1907–1914)
- Nye (1920-1921)

== O ==
- Oakland (1920-1924)
- Ogden (1919-1929)
- Ohio (1905-?)
- Ohio (1912) Cincinnati
- O-K Truck (1916–1927)
- O.K. Motor Truck Company (1913–1916) merged into Lincoln Motor Truck Company in 1916
- Old Hickory (1914–1923)
- Old Reliable (1911–1927)
- Oldsmobile (1897-2004)
- Oliver (1910-1913) Detroit
- Oliver (1905–1960)
- Olympic (1922-1923)
- Olympie
- Omort (1923-1934)
- Oneida (1917-1930)
- Orange EV
- Orleans (1920-1921)
- Oshkosh (1918–present) (Wisconsin Duplex 1917–1918)
- Oscar Lear Automobile Company (1904–1910)
- Ottawa Trucks (1943-1993)
- Overland
- Owen & Graham (Yellow)(1926)
- Owosso (1910-1914)

== P ==
- P&H
- Paccar (1905-)
- Pacific Trucks (1913-?)
- Packard (1904–1931)
- Packers (1910-1913)
- Paige (1903–1911) later GM
- Paige (1918-1923)
- Pak-Mor (garbage trucks)
- Palmer-Meyer (1912-1918)
- Palmer-Moore (1906–1918)
- Pan-American
- Panhard Motors Company (1918-1919)
- Parcel Post Equipment Co. (1914)
- Parker (1918-1933)
- Parr Wagon Company (1909–1910)
- Patrick
- Patriot (1920-)
- Patriot/Woods (1917-1931)
- Paulding (1913-1916)
- Peerless (1900-1931)
- Penn (1911-1913)
- Penn-Unit (1910-1912)
- Penton (1928)
- Perfex (1913-1914)
- Peterbilt (1939–present)
- Philadelphia (1911-1912)
- Phoenix (1908-1910)
- P.H.P. (1911-1912)
- Piedmont (1917–1922)
- Pierce (1955–)
- Pierce-Arrow (1911–c. 1934)
- Piercy (1915-1916)
- Piggins Practical (1911–1916)
- Pioneer (1920-1924)
- Pioneer Stage (1923-1930)
- Pittsburgh (1899–1911) later Autocar
- Pittsburgher (1908-1911)
- Plymouth Commercial (1906-1912)
- Plymouth (1935–1941) Dodge
- Pony (1919-1920)
- Pope-Hartford (1904-1914)
- Poss (1911–1914)
- Power (1917-1923)
- Premier Motor Manufacturing Company (1903-1926)
- Progress (1911-1914)
- Prospect (1924-1934)
- Pull-More (1914-1917)

== Q ==
- Quadray (1904–1905) bus
- Quadru (1911)
- Quality (1962–2003) later Crimson Fire Company

== R ==
- Racine (1917-1918)
- Rainier Motor Car Company (1916–1927)
- Ralston (1913)
- Ram Truck (2009-) Chrysler
- Randolph Motor Car Company (1908–1912)
- Ranger (1920–1922) (distinct from Ranger, a former division of General Motors)
- Rapid (1902–1909) predecessor to GMC Truck
- Rassel (1910-1912)
- Red Ball (1924-1927)
- Red Shield Hustler (1912)
- Regal (1911-1912)
- Arthur Rehberger & Son (1923–1928)
- Reiland & Bree (1923)
- Relay Motors Corporation (1927–1934)
- Reliable-Dayton (1906-1909)
- Reliance Motor Car (1906–1911)
- Reliance Motor Truck Co. (1917–1923) Reliance Motor Truck Co.
- Remington (1911-1913)
- Rennoc-Leslie (1918-1919)
- REO (1908–1967)
- Republic (1913–1929) (later partnered with American LaFrance)
- Rex (1921-1923)
- Reya (1917–1918) Napoleon Motor Car Co.
- Reynolds (1920-1923)
- Riddle (1916-1926)
- Riker (1900–1902)
- Riker (1916–1921)
- O.G. Roberts & Co. (1904)
- Robinson (1909-1920)
- Robinson Fire Apparatus Manufacturing Company (1871-1926)
- Robinson-Loomis (1909–1920)
- Rockford (1914-1916)
- Rockne (1932–1933) Studebaker
- Rock-Falls (1920-1923)
- Rogers (1912-1914)
- Rodgers & Company (1903-1904)
- Rogers Una-Drive (1919-1922)
- Roland Gas Electric Vehicle Corporation (1913-1915) Hexter
- Rovan (1911-1914)
- Rowe (1908–1925)
- Royal (1914-1919)
- Royal Coach (1923-1927)
- R-S (1915-1916)
- Ruggles (1905–1928)
- Rumley
- Rush (1915–1918)

== S ==
- S&S (1907-1912)
- Safety Motor Company (1917-1918) Safety Motor Company
- Salvador (1915-1916)
- Sampson (1905–1912)
- Samson (1920–1923) GM
- Sandow (1915-1928)
- Sandusky Auto Parts & Motor Truck Company (1911–1914)
- Sanford-Herbert (1909–1939) (1969-)
- Saurer Motor Co. (1908–1918) Mack and Hewitt
- Sayers & Scoville
- Schacht (1904–1938)
- Schleicher (1911-1919)
- Schnabel (1914-1916)
- Schurmeier (1909-1911)
- Schwartz (1918–1923)
- Seagrave (1907–1963) in FWD
- Seitz (1908-1913)
- Selden (1906–1932)
- Seneca (1916–1922)
- Service Motor Car (1911–1926)
- Schacht (1910–1938)
- Scot (1972–1980)
- Shaw (1918–1922)
- Shelby (1920)
- Shepherd Auto-Engine Company (1903-1905) Shepmobile Shepherd Auto-Engine Company
- Siebert (1911-1916)
- Signal (1913–1923)
- Simon-Duplex (fire trucks)
- Simplo (1908-1909)
- Sing Sing Truck (1913) built at the State Prison at Sing Sing
- Smeal (1964-) (fire trucks)
- Smith-Milwaukee (1912–1915)
- Soules (1905-1908)
- South Bend (1913-1916)
- Southern (1920–1922)
- Sowers (1913-1914)
- SPA
- Spangler (1947–1949)
- Spartan (1975-2020)
- Spaulding (1913)
- Speedwell (1907-1915)
- Spencer (1921)
- Spencer Manufacturing (1986–) (fire trucks)
- Sphinx (1915)
- Spoerer (1912-1914)
- Standard (1912–1932) Detroit
- Standard (1913–1915)
- Standard Gas-Electric (1907-1908)
- Standard Steam (~1921)
- Standard Tractor Co. (~ 1915)
- Star (1909–1917)
- Star (1922-1932)
- Starbuck (1912-1913)
- Star Motors (1922–1923)
- Stearns (1898–1916)
- Steele (1914–1919)
- Stegeman (1911–1917)
- Steinmetz (1922–1924)
- Stephenson Motor Car Company (1910-1913)
- Sterling (1909-1910) Harvey
- Sterling (1907–1953)
- Sternberg (1900–1916; later Sterling)
- Steward (1912-1916)
- Stewart (1912–1941)
- Steward Iron Works (1913)
- Stewart & Stevenson (1902-)
- St.Cloud (1920)
- St. Louis (1920-1923)
- St. Louis Motor Carriage Company (1901)
- Stoddard (1911–1912)
- Stoughton (1920–1928)
- Stroud (1911-1912)
- Studebaker (1902–1968)
- Stutz (1919–1940)
- Suburban (1912-1913)
- Success (1920–1921)
- Sullivan (1910–1923)
- Super (1919–1936)
- Superior (1911-1912) Detroit
- Superior (1912-1914) Lansing
- Superior (1919–1923) Atlanta
- Superior Coach (1938-1948)
- Super-Truck (1919-1936)
- Sutphen (1890-) (fire trucks)
- Synnestvedt (1903-1907) Synnestvedt Machine Company

== T ==
- Tait (1922–1924)
- Tarrytown Motor Car Co. (1914)
- Taylor (1917-1918) Fremont
- Taylor Goodwin Car & Mfg (1921)
- Terex
- Terraplane delivery wagon (1933-1938)
- TEXAN Texas Motor Car Association (1919–1920)
- Thomart Motor (1922)
- Thomas (1906-1908) Vernon
- Thomas (1916-1917) New York
- Thermo King
- Thor (Now XOS)
- Three Point Truck (1918–1924)
- Tico
- Tiffin (1913–1923)
- Titan Truck Co.(1917–1932)
- Toeppiner (1910-?)
- Toledo (1912-1913)
- Torbensen (1906-1910)
- Touraine (1913-1915)
- Tower motor Truck (1915–1923)
- Trabold Truck (1911–1932)
- Traffic Motor Truck (1917–1929)
- Transit (1912–1916)
- Transport Truck Company (1919–1925)
- Traylor (1920–1928)
- Triangel motor Truck Company (1917–1924)
- Triumpf Motor Car (1911–1912)
- Triumph Truck & Tractor (1920–1922)
- Trojan (1914-1920)
- Tulsa Automobile & Mfg. Co. (1910-?)
- TULSA Witt Thompson (1913–1922)
- Tuttle (1913-1914)
- Twin City (1918–1924)
- Twin City/Ware (1912-1922)
- Twin Coach (1927-1953)

== U ==
- Ultimate Vreeland motor Company (1920–1925)
- United Four-Wheel (1917-1920)
- Union Motor Truck Co. (1901-1904) Philadelphia, Pennsylvania.
- Union (1905) St. Louis
- Union (1912-1914) San Francisco
- Union Motor Truck Company (1917–1925) Bay City
- United Motors (Products) Company (1915–1930)
- United States Motor Truck Company (1909–1930)
- United States Motor Truck Company (1924)
- Universal (1910–1920)
- Uppercu (1924-1927)
- Upton (1902-1903)
- Urban Kentucky wagon (1911–1918)
- Ursus Motor Company (1921–1922)
- U.S. Hybrid (1909–1930)
- Utility (1921–1922) Page Motors Corp.
- Utility (1910-1912) Milwaukee
- Utility Car Company (1918–1919) Richmond

== V ==
- V.E. (or V.E.C.) Electric (1900–1906)
- Van (1909)
- Van Auken Electric Car Company (1913-)
- Van Dyke (1910–1912)
- Van-L Commercial Car Co.|Van-L (1911-1912)
- Van Wambeke (1908–1909)
- V-C (1912-1913)
- Vehicle Equipment (1900-1906) Vehicle Equipment Company
- Verrac (1910–1914)
- Versare Company (1925-1928)
- Velie (1911–1929) Moline
- Vestal (1914)
- Viall Motor Car (1923–1924)
- Victor Motor Trucks (1910-1914) Buffalo
- Victor Motor Truck & Trailer (1920)
- Victor Truck (1920)
- Victor Motors Inc. (1923–1928) St. Louis
- Vim Motor Truck Company (1912–1924)
- Voltz (1915-1918)
- VOMAG Robert Remer (1922–1924)
- Vulcan (1920–1922)
- Vulcan Manufacturing Company (1913-1916)

== W ==
- Wabco (1972-)
- Wachusett (1922–1930) Fitchburg
- Wade (1913-1914)
- Wagenhals (1910-1914)
- Waldron (1911–1912)
- Walker-Johnson (1919–1924) Woburn
- Walker Automobiles Maintenance & Manufacturing Co. (1906–1918) later Walker Vehicle Company
- Walker Vehicle Company (1907–1942) Chicago
- Walter (New York) (1909–1922)
- Walter (Wisconsin)
- Waltham Motor (1921) Chicago (Formerly Victor)
- Waltham-Orient (1906-1908)
- Ward la France (1916–1979)
- Ward (1918–1922)
- Ward IC (1933–1980) bus
- Ware (1912-1915)
- Ware Motor Vehicles Corporation (1918–1920) St. Paul
- Warren (1911–1913)
- Washington (1911) Washington
- Washington (1914-1916) Hyattsville
- Waterous (1906-1923)
- Waterville (1911)
- Watson Products Corporation (1918–1924)
- Watson Wagon Company (1917-1925)
- Waverly (1898–1916)
- Wayne (1837-1995)
- Wayne (1914) New York
- Webb (1913)
- Weeks (1907-1908)
- Weier-Smith (1914–1918)
- Western Star
- Western Truck (1917–1923)
- Westinghouse (1901) (1904–1907) Le Havre (F) (1904–1912)
- Westman (1912-1914)
- Weyher (1910)
- White (1900–1980)
- White-Freightliner
- White-GMC
- White Hickory (1916–1922)
- White-Mustang
- Whiteside (1911–1912)
- White-Western Star (1912-1914)
- Whiting (1904–1905)
- Wichita (1911–1932)
- Wilcox (1910–1927)
- Willet (1912-1914)
- Will W.M.C. (1927–1930) later Yellow Coach
- Willys
- Willys-Overland (1908-1953)
- Wilson Co. (1914–1925)
- Winkler (1911-1912)
- Winther Motors Inc. (1917–1926)
- Winton Motor Carriage Company (1897–1962)
- Wisconsin Duplex (1917–1918; Oshkosh Truck afterward)
- Wisconsin (1912-1926)
- Wisconsin Myers machine Company (1918–1923)
- Wisconsin Truck Company (1919–1922)
- Wisconsin Farm Tractor Company (1921–1923)
- Witt-Will (1911–1931)
- Wolfe (1909–1910)
- Wolverine American Commercial Car Company (1918–1922)
- Wolverine-Detroit (1912-1913)
- F. R. Wood & Son (1848-1939) F. R. Wood & Son
- W.A. Wood Automobile Manufacturing Company (1910-?) producing Commer Car Trucks
- Woodburn (1905-1912) Woodburn Auto Company
- Wood-Loco Vehicle Company (1901-1903) Wood-Loco Vehicle Company
- Woods (1927–1931)
- Woolstone (1913)
- Worcester Lunch Car
- Workhorse
- World (1927–1931)
- Worth (1907–1910)
- Wyeth Motor Car Company (1911-1913) Wyeth Motor Car Company

== X ==
- Xos, Inc.

== Y ==
- Yale Motor Truck Company (1921–1922)
- Yellow (1922–1925)
- Young Motor truck Company (1920–1923)

== Z ==
- Zeitler & Lamson Truck Co. (1914-1917)
- Zeligson (1946-2021)
- Zimmerman (1912–1916)

== See also ==
- Dump truck
- List of automobile manufacturers
- List of defunct automobile manufacturers
- List of dump truck manufacturers
- List of truck manufacturers
- List of electric truck makers
- Semi-trailer and semi-trailer truck
- Tractor unit
