= American Coulthard Co. =

Defunct American motor vehicle manufacturer

- Type: Truck Company
- Industry: Manufacturing
- Founded: 1905; 121 years ago
- Defunct: 1906; 120 years ago
- Headquarters: Boston, US
- Products: Trucks

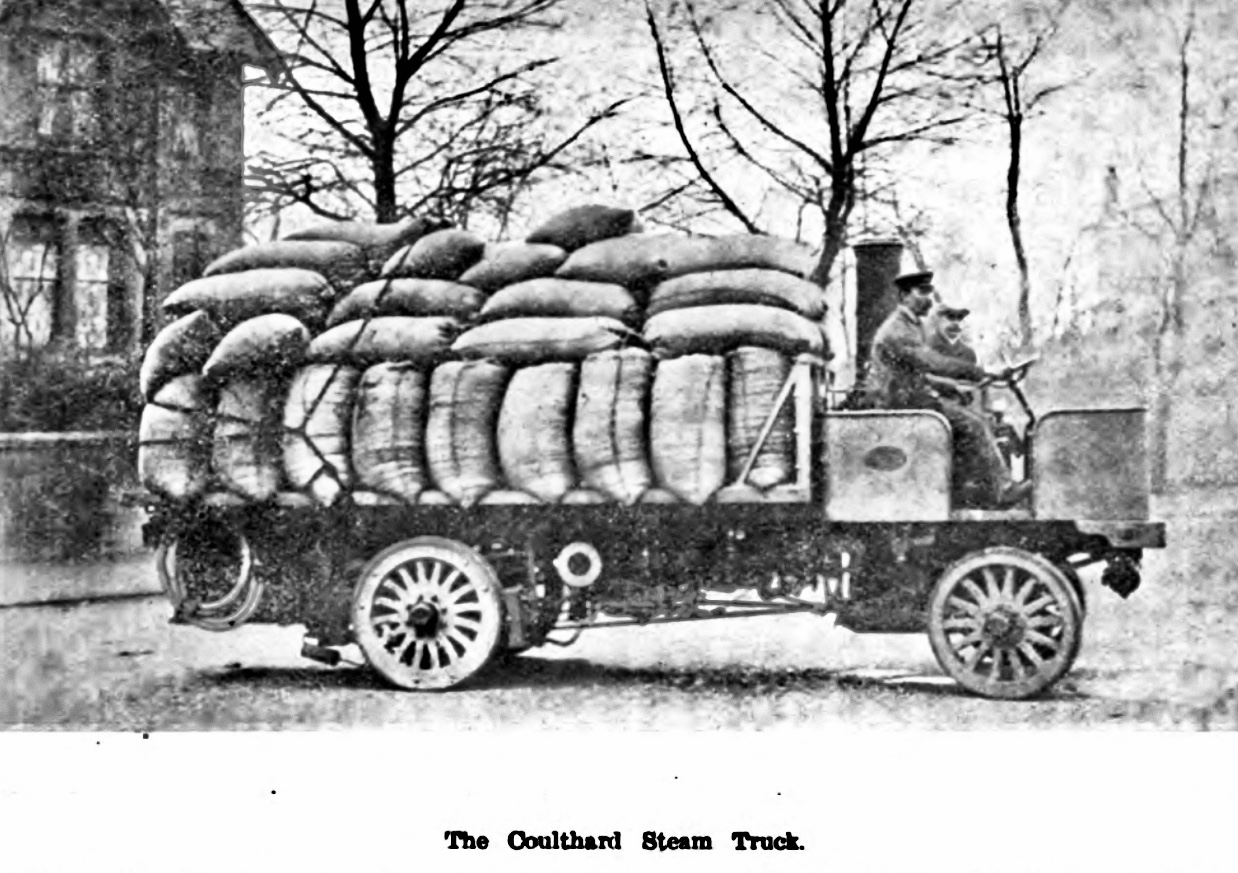
American Coulthard Steam Truck (1905)

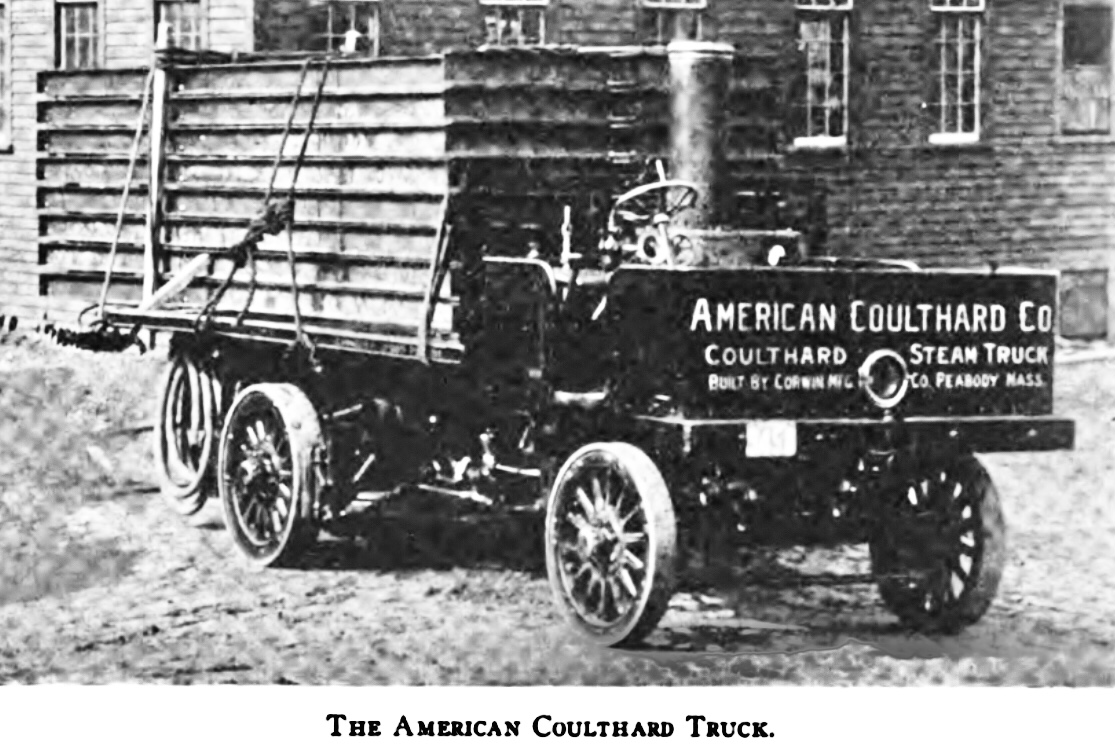
American Coulthard Steam Truck build by Corwin Manufacturing Company of Peabody, Mass.

The American Coulthard Co., of Boston, was a truck manufacturer.

== History ==
The American Coulthard Co. produced steam trucks from 1905 to 1906. The English businessman Coulthard, who had obtained several patents and gained experience with steam locomotives and steam lorries, was one of the first to implement this experience in the States. One model had a 30 hp steam engine. The wheelbase was 3302 mm. The overall length was 6096 mm and the vehicle width was 1905 mm. The selling price was 4000 dollars. A truck for coal transport was designed for 6 tons. In addition to Boston, Chicago was also listed as a location. The Corwin Manufacturing Company of Peabody, Massachusetts, successor to the Vaughan Machine Company, which holds the American rights for the English design of the Coulthard truck, is producing a series of twenty-five of these 6-ton trucks. The Coulthard truck is capable of towing a trailer with a load of 5 tons.
