= Abresch-Cramer Auto Truck Company =

Defunct American motor vehicle manufacturer

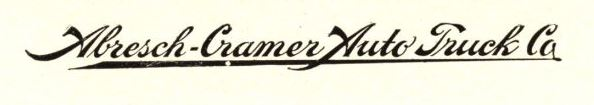
- Company type: Truck Company
- Industry: Manufacturing
- Founded: 1910; 116 years ago
- Founder: Charles Abresch
- Defunct: 1912; 114 years ago
- Headquarters: Milwaukee, US
- Products: Trucks

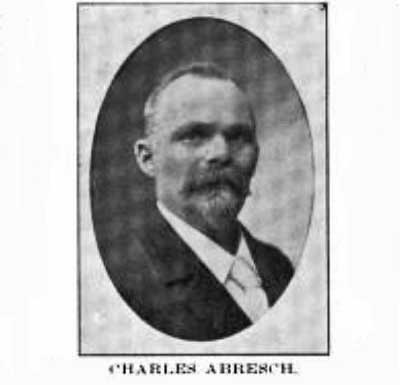
Charles Abresch (1910)

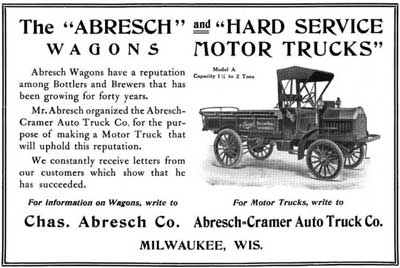
Abresch-Cramer advertisement (1910)

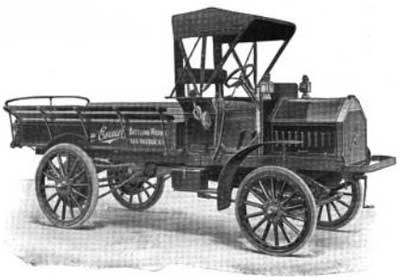
Abresch-Cramer Model A

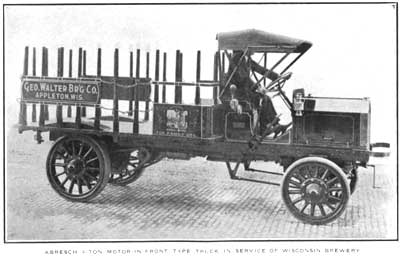
Abresch-Cramer Model B

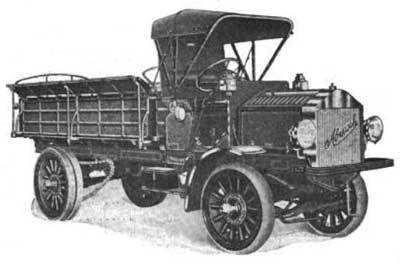
Abresch-Cramer Model C

The Abresch-Cramer Auto Truck Company of Milwaukee, was a truck manufacturer.

== History ==
The Abresch-Cramer Auto Truck Company produced trucks from 1910 to 1912. The company was established as a subsidiary of the Charles Abresch Company in Milwaukee (Wisconsin), which has existed since 1871 and specialized in carriages and bodies, in order to focus on motorized commercial vehicle production. The Abresch-Cramer Auto Truck Company was financed with US$20,000, with Charles Abresch, Robert Crawley, and Louis Schneller on the board. The managing director was the designer Robert Cramer, originally Kremers.

== Products ==
=== Production figures Abresch-Cramer trucks ===
The pre-assigned serial numbers only indicate the maximum possible production quantity.

Year	Production figures	Model	Load capacity	Serial number
1910		A	2 t	
		B	3 t	
		C	4t	
	> 6	bus		
Sum	~ 100			
1911		A	2 t	
		B	3 t	
		C	4 t	
1912		A	2 t	
		B	3 t	
		C	4 t	
Sum				
