= Rodgers & Company =

Defunct American motor vehicle manufacturer

- Type: Truck and Car Company
- Industry: Manufacturing
- Founded: 1903; 123 years ago
- Defunct: 1904; 122 years ago
- Headquarters: Columbus, Ohio, US
- Products: Trucks cars

The Rodgers & Company of Columbus, Ohio, was a truck and car manufacturer.

== History ==
Imperial Model D (1903-1904)

Imperial Model A (1903-1904)

Imperial Model C (1903-1904)

In 1903, it started producing automobiles. The brand name was officially Imperial. Superintendent T. W. Picard was the designer of the vehicles. Rodgers & Company was an early car manufacturer in the USA. With its delivery van of type D, it was recorded in the first official truck statistics, which was created for the first time in 1904. The first statistic is based on 411 trucks. Of these, 195 were gasoline, 214 electric, and 2 steam. The 195 gasoline trucks were further divided into 140 delivery vans and 55 trucks. The Imperial Type D model is one of the 140 delivery vans. How many Type D have been produced is not known. Production ended in 1904.

== Production Models ==
- Imperial Model A
- Imperial Model C
- Imperial Model D
