= C.L. Barker =

Defunct American motor vehicle manufacturer

- Company type: Truck Company
- Industry: Manufacturing
- Founded: 1912; 114 years ago
- Founder: Charles L. Barker
- Defunct: 1917; 109 years ago
- Headquarters: Norwalk, Connecticut, US
- Products: Trucks

C.L. Barker of Norwalk, Connecticut, was a truck manufacturer.

== History ==
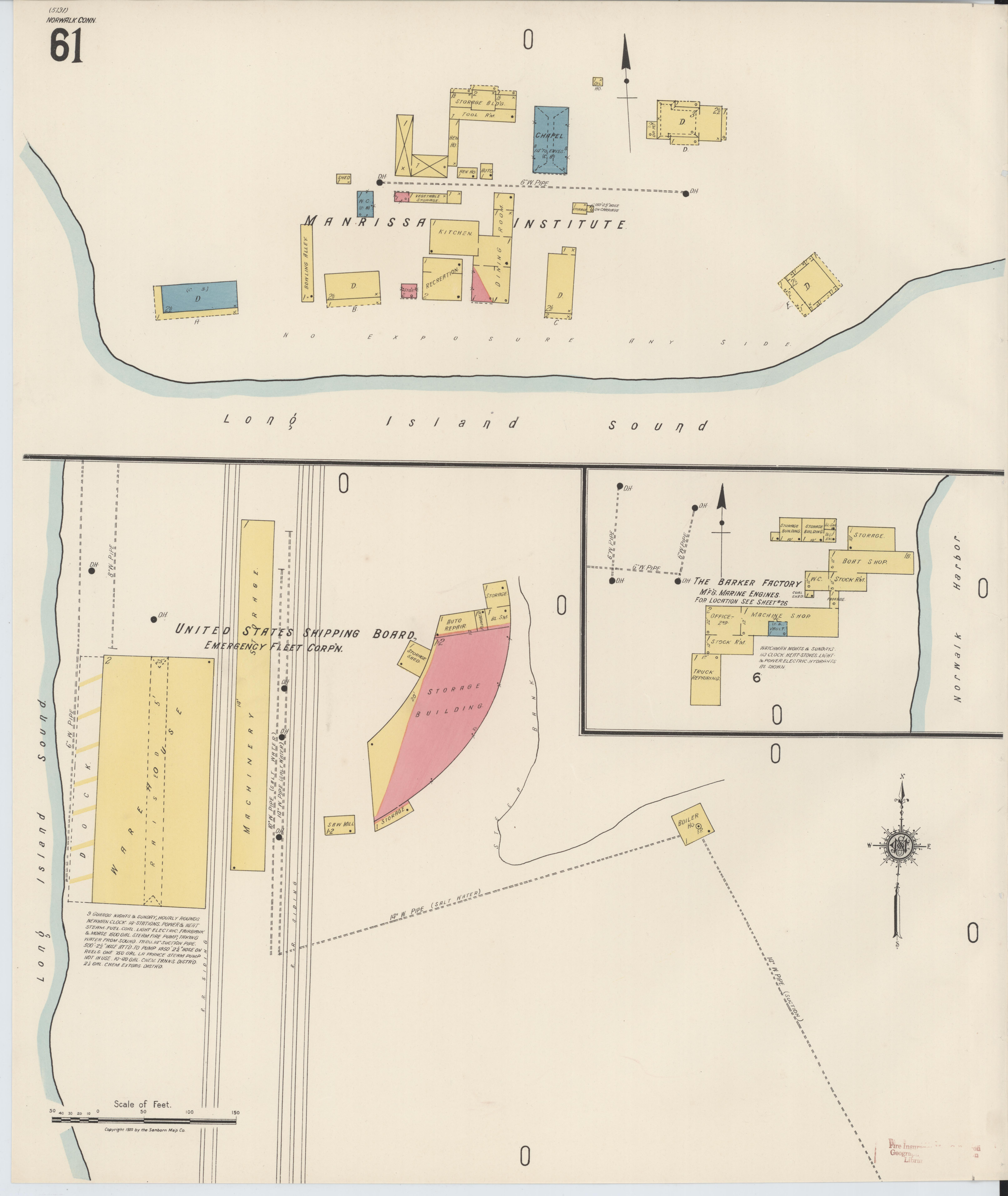
Barker plant (1922)

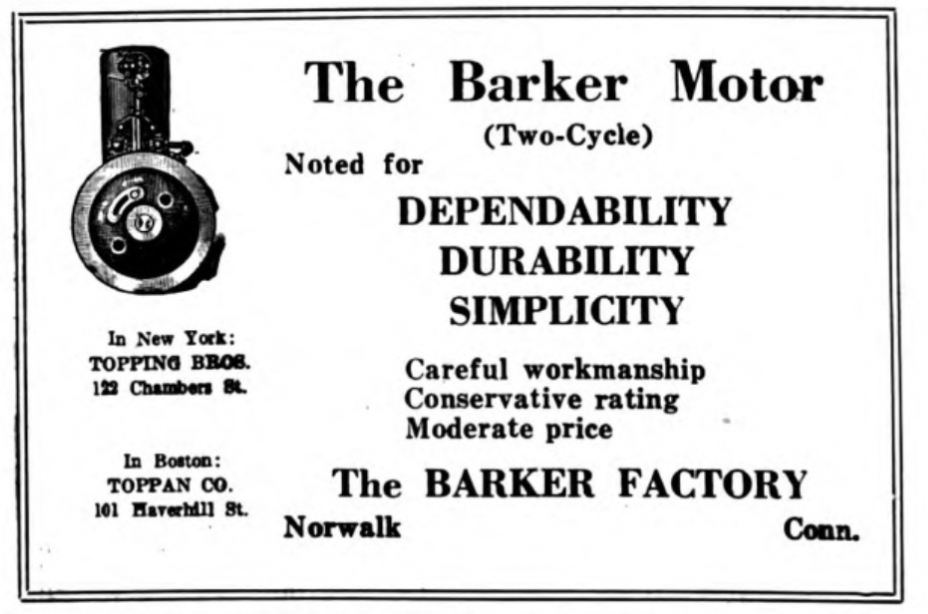
C.L. Barker Marine Engine

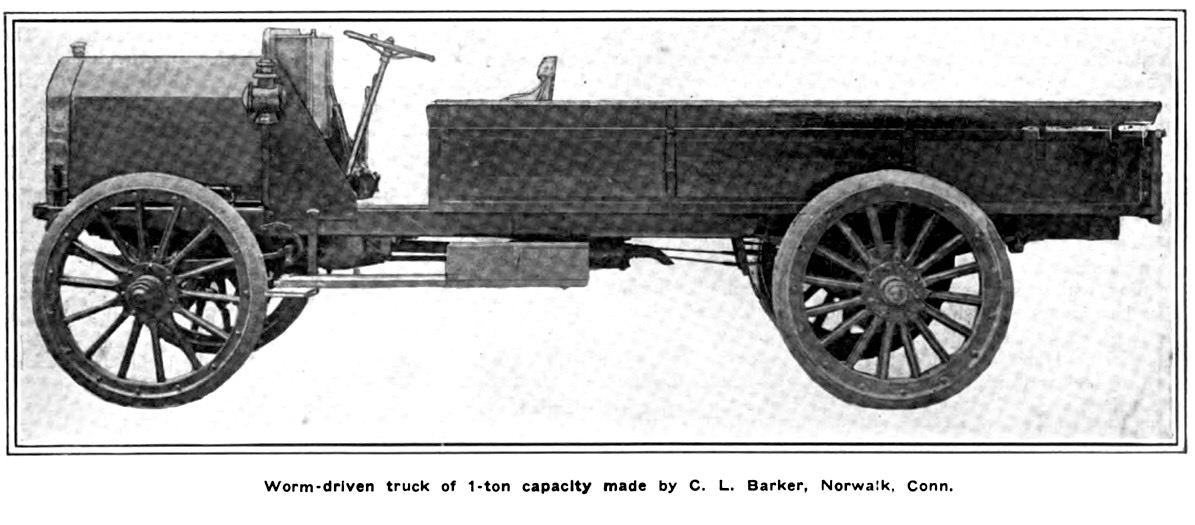
C.L. Barker (1913) 1 to

The company, founded in 1912 in Norwalk, Connecticut, manufactured trucks under the brand name Barker. In 1916, the models S, U, and V were available. The Model S was designed for a payload of 2000 lbs = 0.9 t and cost $1050 as a chassis. The four-cylinder engine of the Model S had 2719 cc with a bore of 82.55 mm and a stroke of 127 mm. The Model U was designed for a payload of 3,000 lbs = 1.4 tons and cost $1,550 as a chassis. The four-cylinder engine of the Model U had 4119 cc with a bore of 101.6 mm and a stroke of 127 mm . The Model V was designed for a payload of 5,000 lbs = 2.3 tons and cost $1,750 as a chassis. The four-cylinder engine of the Model V had 4119 cc with a bore of 101.6 mm and a stroke of 127 mm. After the end of truck production, engine supply for boat construction was started.
