= Larrabee-Deyo Motor Truck Company =

Defunct American motor vehicle manufacturer

- Type: Truck and Car Company
- Industry: Manufacturing
- Founded: 1915; 111 years ago
- Founder: H. Chester Larrabee and R. Herbert Deyo
- Defunct: 1932; 94 years ago
- Headquarters: Binghamton, New York, US
- Products: Trucks cars

The Larrabee-Deyo Motor Truck Company of Binghamton, New York, was a truck and car manufacturer.

== History ==
Larrabee truck (1918)

Larrabee Model A-3 (1928) 1 to

Larrabee advertisement (1921)

The Sturtevant-Larrabee Company, founded around 1850, was a maker of sleds, carriages, and wagons. The company from Binghamton, New York had produced 5,639 sleds by 1893. With the rise of cars and trucks, demand for sleds and carriages dropped. The last horse-drawn carriages and sleds were built around 1914. In 1915/1916, the company was renamed to Larrabee-Deyo Motor Truck Company. They started making fire trucks, ambulances, delivery vans, trucks and even taxis. Between 1916 and 1932, it produced commercial vehicles. The brand name was Larrabee. In addition, from 1925 to 1927, several hundred passenger cars and taxis under the Majestic brand were made.

== Production Models ==
| Year | Production figures | Model | Load capacity | Serial number |
|---|---|---|---|---|
| 1916 | 48 | 1,5-2 | 1,5-2 to | 161 to 208 |
| | 238 | 1 | 1 to | 0161 to 0398 |
| Sum | 286 | | | |
| 1917 | ↓ | M | 1 to | 1701 to 1778 |
| | 11 | N | 1,5 to | 209 to 219 |
| | 78 | O | 2,5 to | 1701 to 1778 |
| | ↑ | P | 2,5 to | 1701 to 1778 |
| | ↑ | R | 3,5 to | 1701 to 1778 |
| | ↑ | S | 3,5 to | 1701 to 1778 |
| Sum | 89 | | | |
| 1918 | | M | 1 to | |
| | | N | 1,5 to | |
| | | O-P | 2,5 to | |
| | | R-S | 3,5 to | |
| | | T | 5 to | |
| 1919 | | | to | |
| 1920 | 94 | U | 1,5 to | 184125 to 184218 |
| | 92 | K | 2,5 to | 203101 to 203119; 203501 to 203573 |
| | 49 | L | 3,5 to | 202101 to 212103; 202501 to 202546 |
| | 5 | W | 5 to | 201501 to 201505 |
| Sum | 240 | | | |
| 1921 | 44 | U | 1,5 to | 184218 to 184261 |
| | 35 | K | 2,5 to | 203120 to 203127; 203547 to 203573 |
| | 110 | L | 3,5 to | 202515 to 212619; 202104 to 202108 |
| | | W | 5 to | 201506 to |
| | 81 | X2 | 1 to | 215101 to 215181 |
| Sum | > 270 | | | |
| 1922 | | X2 | 1,25 to | 215101 to 201505 |
| | | J4 | 1,5-2,25 to | 214101 to 214109 |
| | | SK | 2,5-3 to | 203101 to |
| | | EK5 | 2,5-3 to | |
| | | SL4 | 3,5-4,5 to | |
| | | EL4 | 3,5-4,5 to | |
| | | SL5 | 3,5-5 to | |
| | | EL5 | 3,5-5 to | |
| | | W | 7 to | |
| 1923 | 562 | L1 | 1,25 to | 215418 to 215979 |
| | ↑ | L4 | 1,25 to | 215418 to 215979 |
| | ↑ | L5 | 1,25 to | 215418 to 215979 |
| | ↑ | L6 | 1,25 to | 215418 to 215979 |
| | ↑ | L8 | 1,25 to | 215418 to 215979 |
| | ↑ | L10 | 15 Passenger bus | 215418 to 215979 |
| | 50 | J4 | 2,25 to | 214142 to 214191 |
| | 8 | SK5 | 3,5 to | 213106 to 213113 |
| | 17 | EK5 | 3,5to | 213528 to 213544 |
| | 17 | SL4 | 4,5 to | 212109 to 212125 |
| | 6 | EL4 | 4,5 to | 212512 to 212517 |
| | | W | 5-7 to | 201511 to |
| Sum | > 660 | | | |
| 1924 | | L1 | 1,25 to | 245101 to |
| | | L4 | 1,25 to | 245101 to |
| | | L5 | 1,25 to | 245101 to |
| | | L6 | 1,25 to | 245101 to |
| | | L8 | 1,25 to | 245101 to |
| | | L10 | 15 Passenger bus | 245101 to |
| | | XJ1 | 2,25 to | 2441101 to |
| | | XJ2 | 2,25 to | 2441101 to |
| | | XJ3 | 21 Passenger bus | 244201 to |
| | | SK5 | 3,5 to | 243115 to |
| | | EK5 | 3,5 to | 243545 to |
| | | SL4 | 4,5 to | 212116 to |
| | | EL4 | 4,5 to | 212516 to |
| | | XH3 | 21 Passenger bus | 246301 to |
| | | XH1 | 2,25 to | 246101 to |
| | | XH2 | 2,25 to | 246201 to |
| 1925 | | A1 | 0,75 to | |
| | | X2 | 1,25 to | |
| | | X2S | 1,25 to | |
| | | XJ1 | 2,25 to | |
| | | XJ2 | 2,25 to | |
| | | XH1 | 2,25 to | |
| | | XH2 | 2,25 to | |
| | | SK5 | 3,5 to | |
| | | EK5 | 3,5 to | |
| | | SL4 | 4,5 to | |
| | | EL4 | 4,5 to | |
| | | SL6 | 5 to | |
| | | EL6 | 5 to | |
| | | X2 | 15 Passenger bus | |
| | | L10 | 15 Passenger bus | |
| | | XH2 | Fire Engine | |
| | | XH3 | 21 Passenger bus | |
| | | XH4 | 25-30 Passenger bus | |
| 1926 | | A1 | 0,75 to | |
| | | X21 | 1,25 to | |
| | | X2S | 1,25 to | |
| | | XJ1 | 2,25 to | |
| | | XJ2 | 2,25 to | |
| | | X2 | 15 Passenger bus | |
| | | L10 | 15 Passenger bus | |
| | | XH1 | 3,25 to | |
| | | XH2 | 2,25 to | |
| | | XH2 | Fire Engine | |
| | | XH3 | 21 Passenger bus | |
| | | XH4 | 25-30 Passenger bus | |
| | | SK5 | 3,5 to | |
| | | EK5 | 3,5 to | |
| | | SL6 | 5 to | |
| | | EL6 | 5 to | |
| 1927 | | A3 | 1 to | |
| | | X21 | 2 to | |
| | | X33 | 2 to | |
| | | XH25 | 3 to | |
| | | SK5 | 3,5 to | |
| | | EK5 | 3,5 to | |
| | | SL6 | 5to | |
| | | EL6 | 5 to | |
| | | XH31 | 21 Passenger bus | |
| | | Majestic Landaulet | car | 10000 to |
| | | Majestic Limousine | car | 10000 to |
| 1928 | | A3 | 1 to | 2871-1 to |
| | | A3L | 1 to | 2871-1 to |
| | | X21 | 1,5 to | |
| | | X33 | 2 to | 2852-1 to |
| | | X33D | 2 to | |
| | | X33S | 2 to | |
| | | X33L | 2 to | |
| | | XH25 | 2,5-3 to | |
| | | XH16 | 2,5-3 to | 2862-1 to |
| | | XH25 | 3 to | |
| | | XH31 | 21 Passenger bus | 2863 to |
| | | XH32 | 3 to | |
| | | X34 | Fire Engine | |
| | | XH26 | Fire Engine | |
| | | XK1 | bus chassis | |
| | | XK1 | 4-5 to | |
| 1929 | | 20 | 1 to | 29201 to |
| | | 30 | 1,5 to | 29301 to |
| | | 40 | 2 to | 29401 to |
| | | 50 | 2,5 to | 29501 to |
| | | 60 | 3 to | 29601 to |
| | | 70 | 3,5 to | 29701 to |
| Sum | 363 | | | |
| 1930 | | | to | |
| 1931 | | 25 | 1,5 to | |
| 1932 | | | to | |
| Sum | | | | |
