= Biddle-Murray Manufacturing Company =

American truck manufacturer, 1907–1920

- Company type: Truck and car Company
- Industry: Manufacturing
- Founded: 1905; 121 years ago
- Founder: John D. Black, Edward C. Maher, Ralph McShaw
- Defunct: 1907; 119 years ago
- Headquarters: Oak Park, Illinois, US
- Products: Trucks and Cars

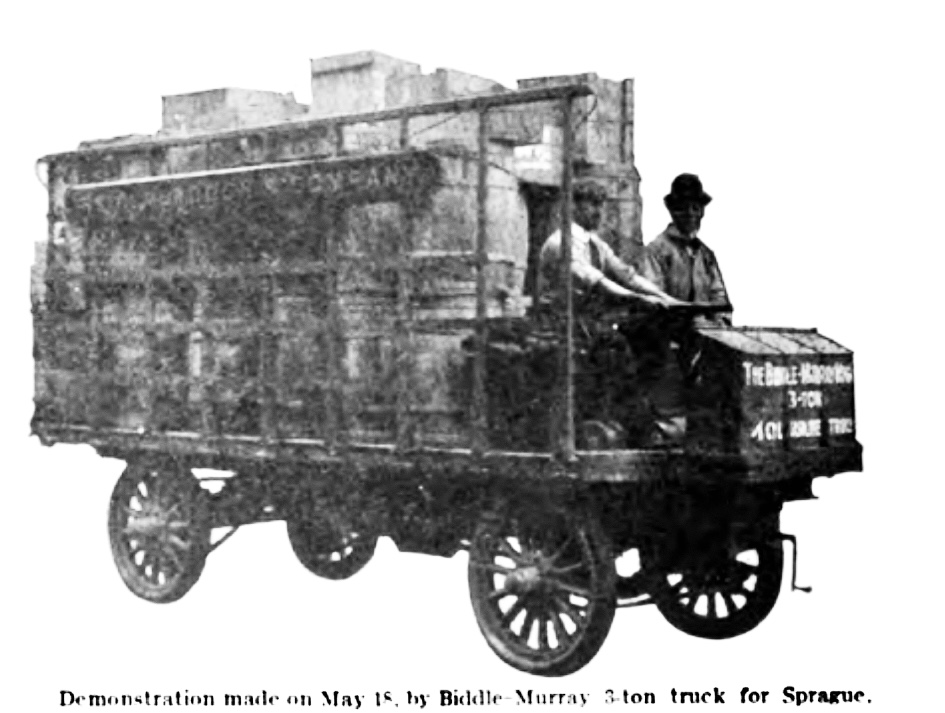
Biddle-Murray 3 t(1906)

The Biddle-Murray Manufacturing Company of Oak Park, Illinois, was a truck and car manufacturer.

== History ==
The company was founded in 1905 by John D. Black, Edward C. Maher, and Ralph McShaw. The factory in Oak Park, Illinois, produced both passenger cars and trucks. The brand name was Biddle-Murray. Production ended in March 1907 when the company went bankrupt.

== Products ==
The company manufactured a three-ton gasoline truck with a four-cylinder 50-hp engine that develops its rated power at 900 revolutions per minute. The engine is water-cooled. The vehicle is designed for a top speed of 15 miles per hour. The radiators are located under the seat and protected by an iron grille. The clutch is a multi-plate type, mounted in the flywheel, and runs in oil. The drive to the rear axle is transmitted via a driveshaft. The rear axle is driven by chains. The transmission had four forward gears as well as one reverse gear. The wheels are made of wood with 14 spokes and a diameter of 22 inches. Each of the rear wheels has a band brake, and a third brake on the driveshaft responsible for slowing down. Ignition and throttle control are operated via levers on the steering wheel, which act through the column.
