= Adams Brothers Manufacturing Company =

Defunct American motor vehicle manufacturer

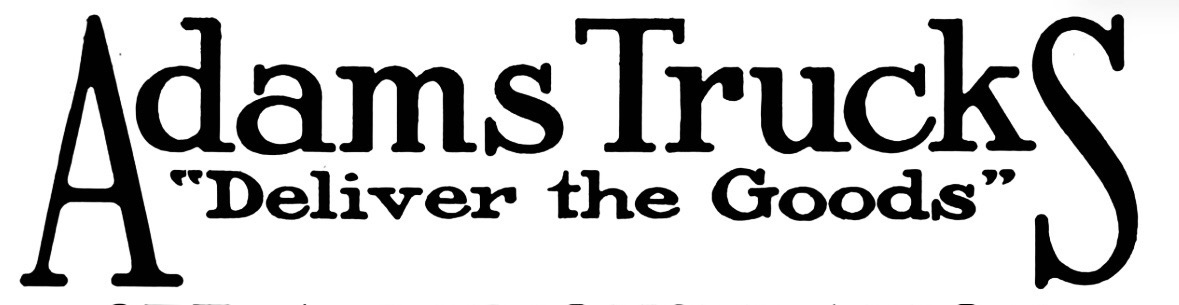
- Type: Truck Company
- Industry: Manufacturing
- Founded: 1910; 116 years ago
- Defunct: 1916; 110 years ago
- Headquarters: Findlay, Ohio, US
- Products: Trucks, buses

The Adams Brothers Manufacturing Company from Ohio was based in Findlay. The Adams trucks were first produced in 1910.

== History ==
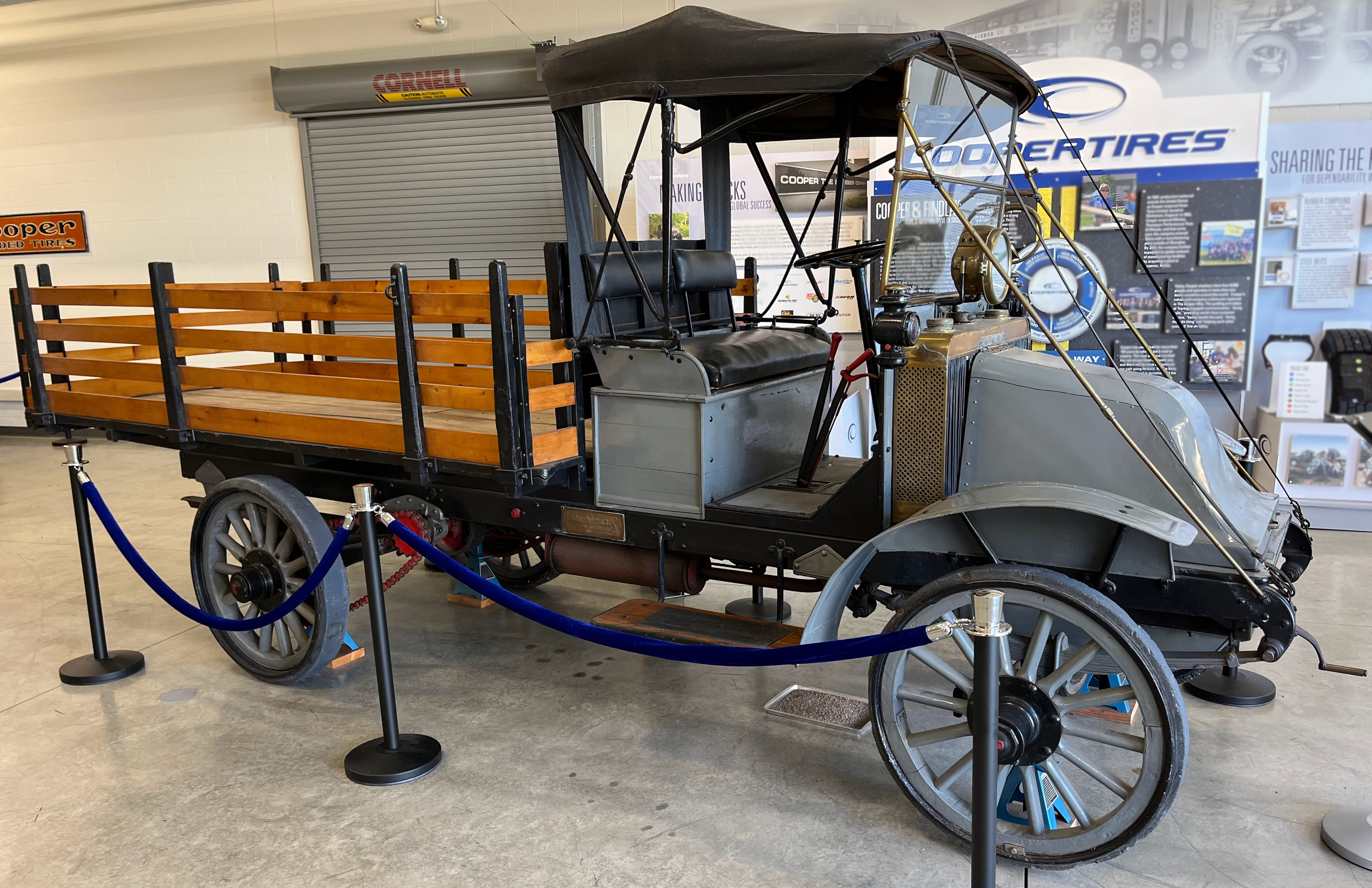
Adams Brothers Company Truck

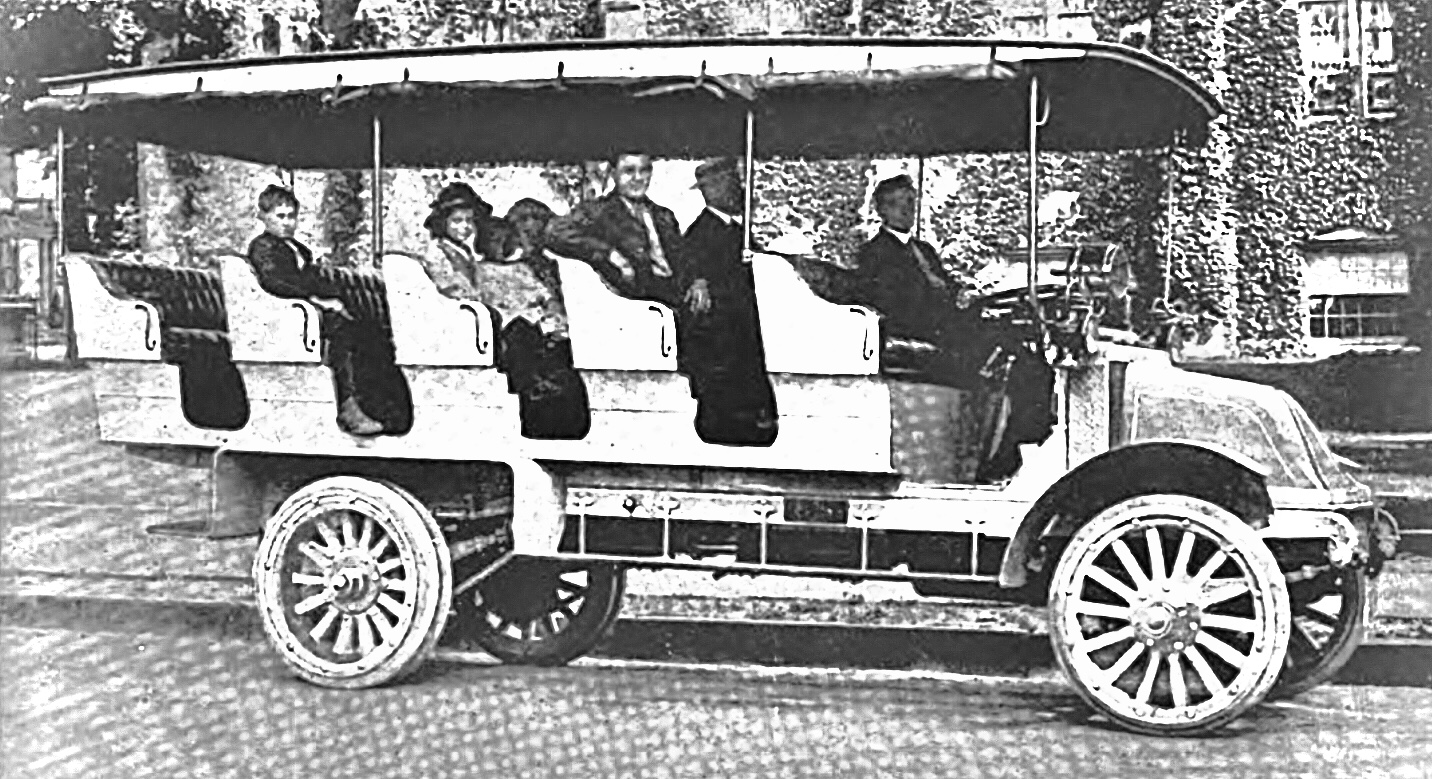
Adams Brothers Omnibus (1914)

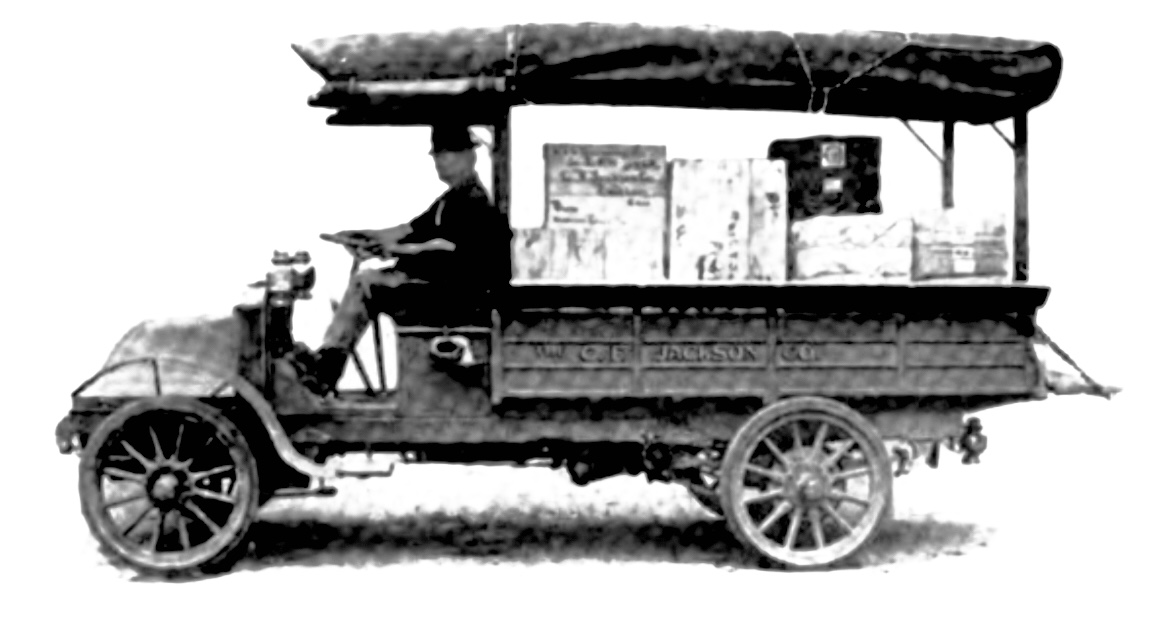
Adams Brothers (1913)

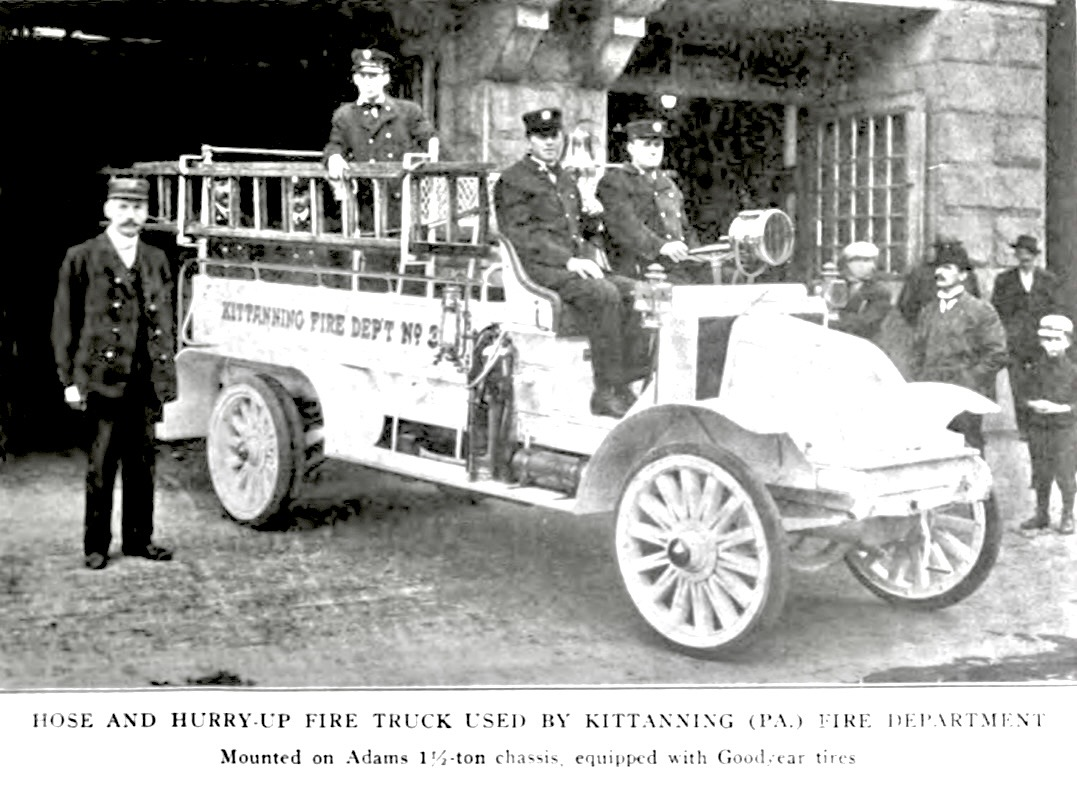
Adams 1,5 to fire engine (1913)

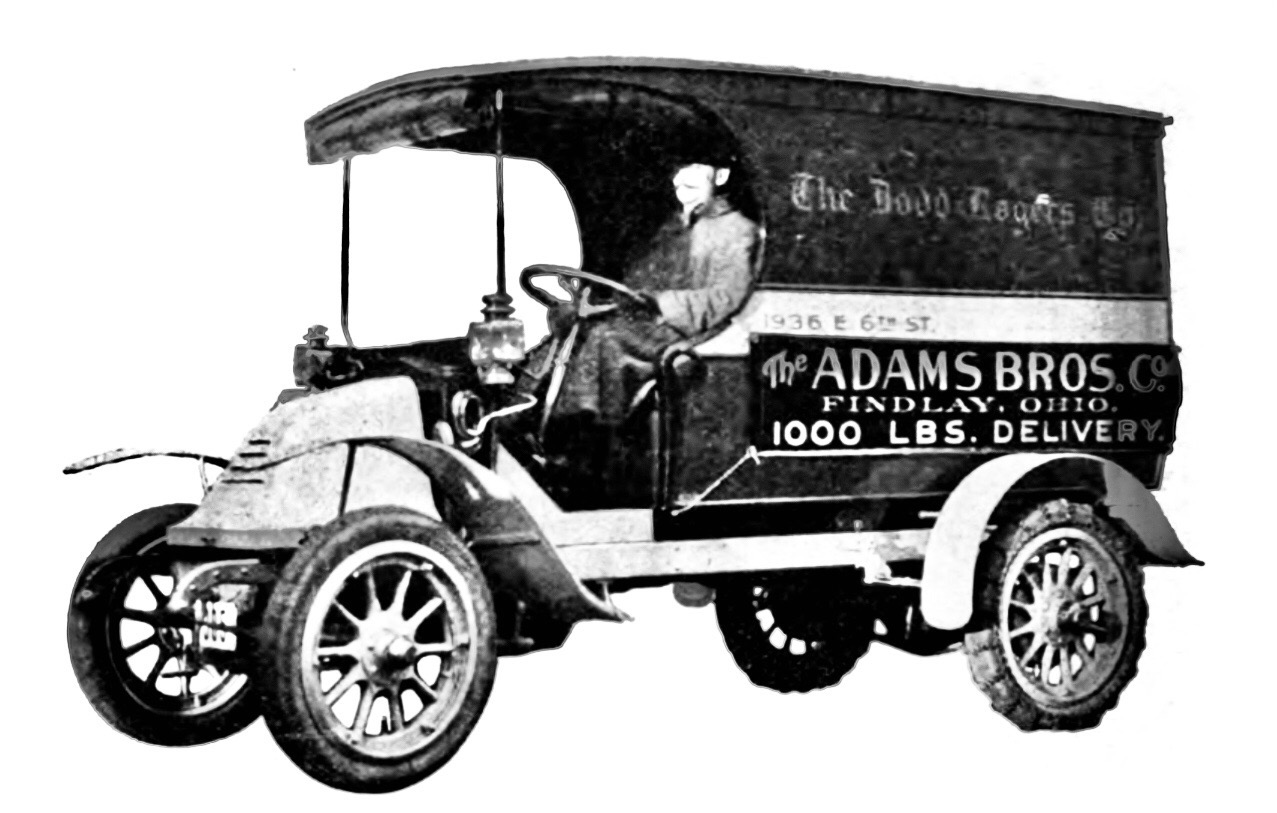
Adams Brothers 0.75 ton Delivery Van (1911)

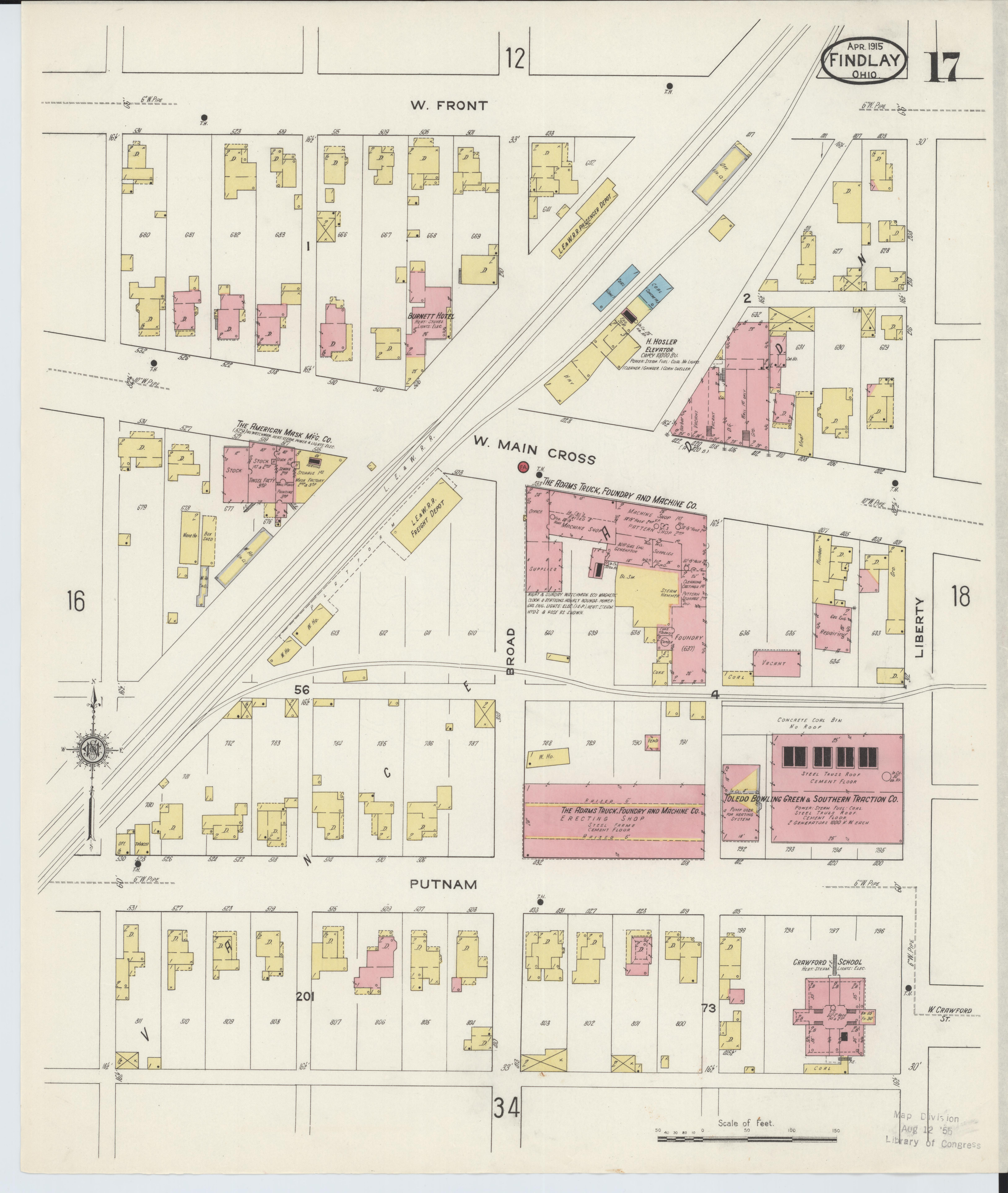
Adams Brothers: The factory was located on West Main Cross 433

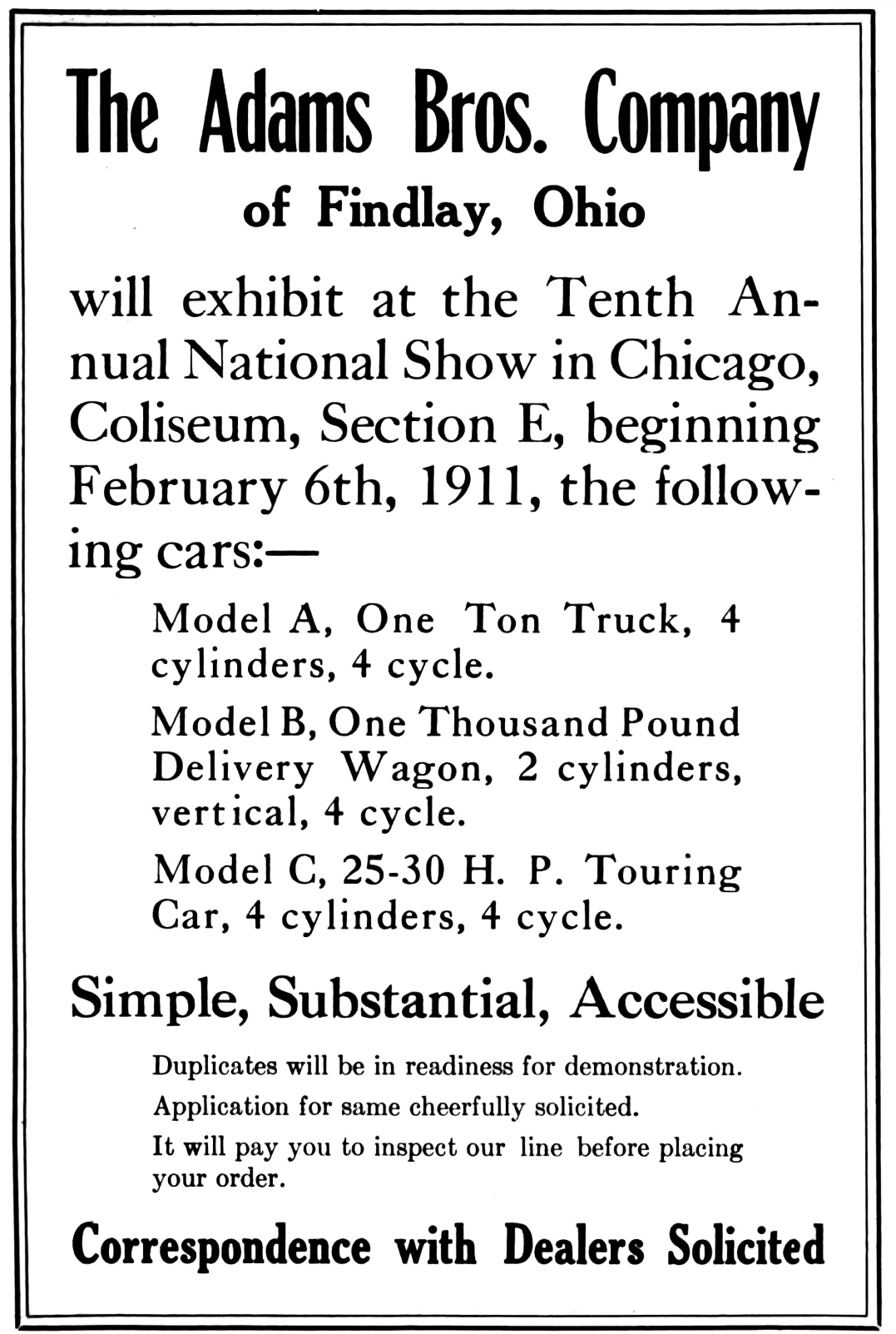
Adams Bros. Company (1911)

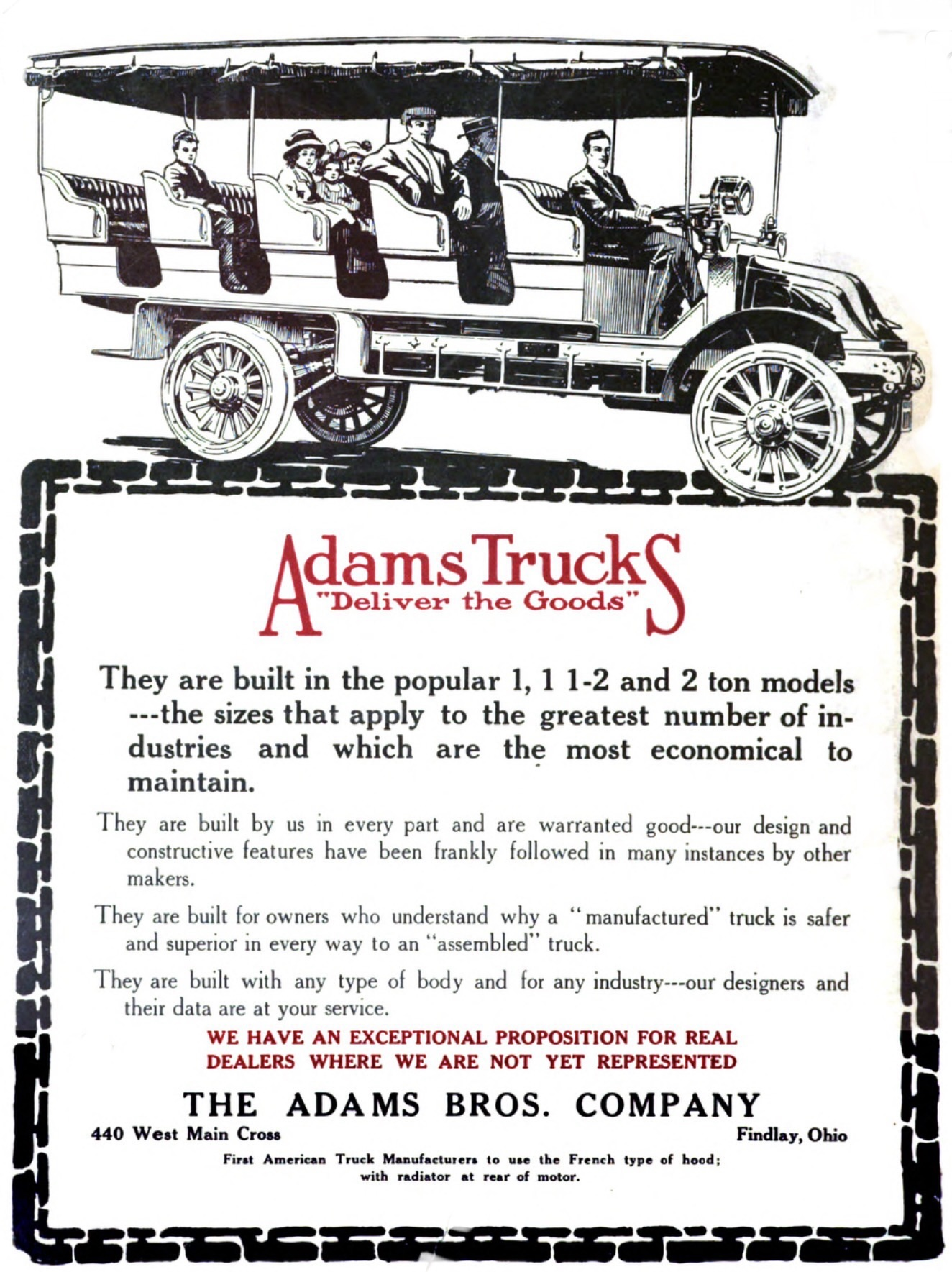
Adams trucks advertisement (1913)

The company Adams Brothers Manufacturing Company, based in Findlay, Ohio, produced trucks and buses from 1910 to 1916, ranging from 0.75 tons to 2.5 tons. The first vehicle was a 0.75 ton Delivery Van, equipped with a two-cylinder engine. The engine had 1933 cc with a bore of 98,425 mm and a stroke of 127 mm. The wheelbase was 2642 mm. Starting in 1911, trucks with four-cylinder engines followed. The Model A was a 1-ton truck with 30 HP. The engine had 3620 cc with a bore of 95.25 mm and a stroke of 127 mm. The vehicle was available in two wheelbase lengths: 3073 mm or 3454 mm. The engine drove the three-speed transmission with differential located in front of the rear axle via a drive shaft. The rear axle wheels were driven from there by a chain. The Model D was a 1,5 ton truck with 35 HP. The engine had 4380 cc with a bore of 104,775 mm and a stroke of 127 mm. The vehicle was available in two wheelbase lengths: 3073 mm or 3454 mm. The Model E was a 2 ton truck with 35 HP. The engine had 4380 cc with a bore of 104,775 mm and a stroke of 127 mm. The wheelbase was 3556 mm . In 1915, the company got into financial trouble. In 1916, a short revival occurred under the company name Adams Truck, Foundry & Machine Company at the same location, featuring a new 2.5-ton model. In addition, the production of the 1t and the 2t has been resumed. Despite renewed efforts, the company had to close its doors for good in 1916.

== Sources ==
- Halwart Schrader, Jan P. Norbye: Das Lastwagen Lexikon, Alle Marken 1900 bis heute. Motorbuch Verlag; 3. Auflage. 1998, ISBN 3613018373
- "Adams Motor Truck". The Horseless Age. XXVIII (25). New York: The Horseless Age Company: 924. December 20, 1911. OCLC 1643782.
