= Commercial Truck Company of America =

Defunct American motor vehicle manufacturer

- Type: Truck Company
- Industry: Manufacturing
- Founded: 1906
- Defunct: 1928
- Headquarters: Philadelphia, Pennsylvania, US
- Products: Trucks

The Commercial Truck Company of America of Philadelphia, was a truck manufacturer.

== History ==
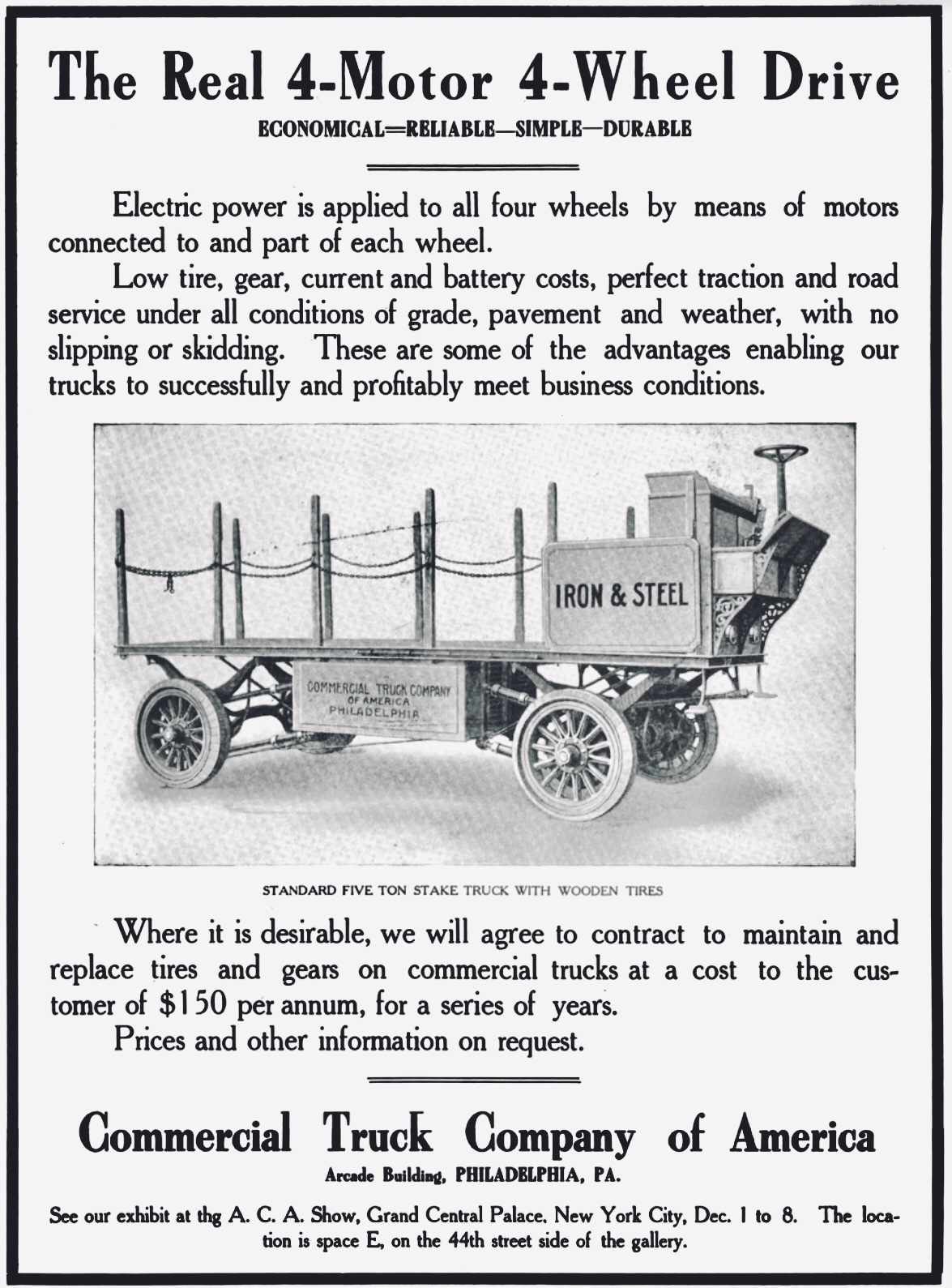
Commercial Truck Company of America (1906)

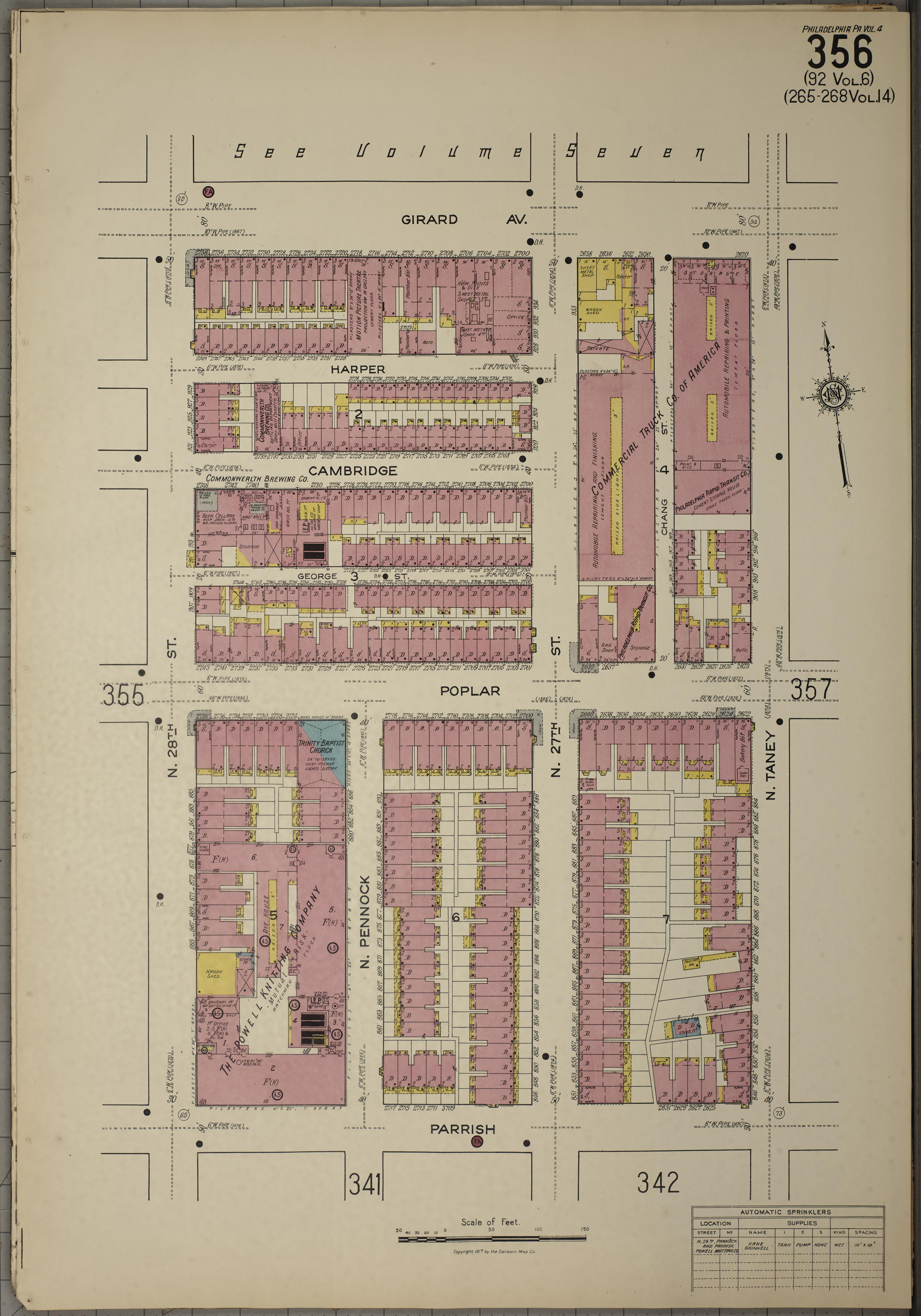
Commercial Truck Company of America plant (1917)

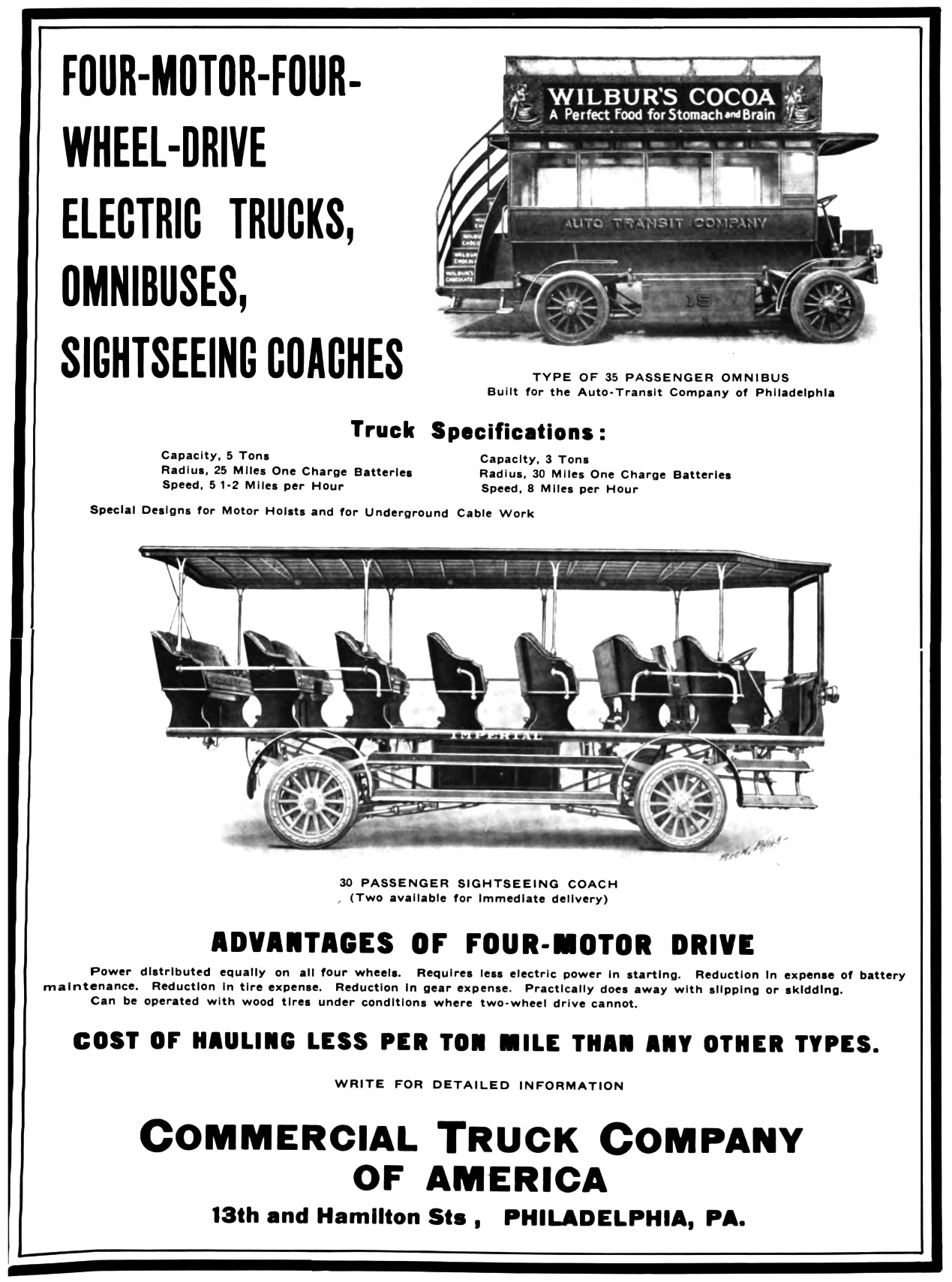
Commercial Truck Company of America (1907) bus

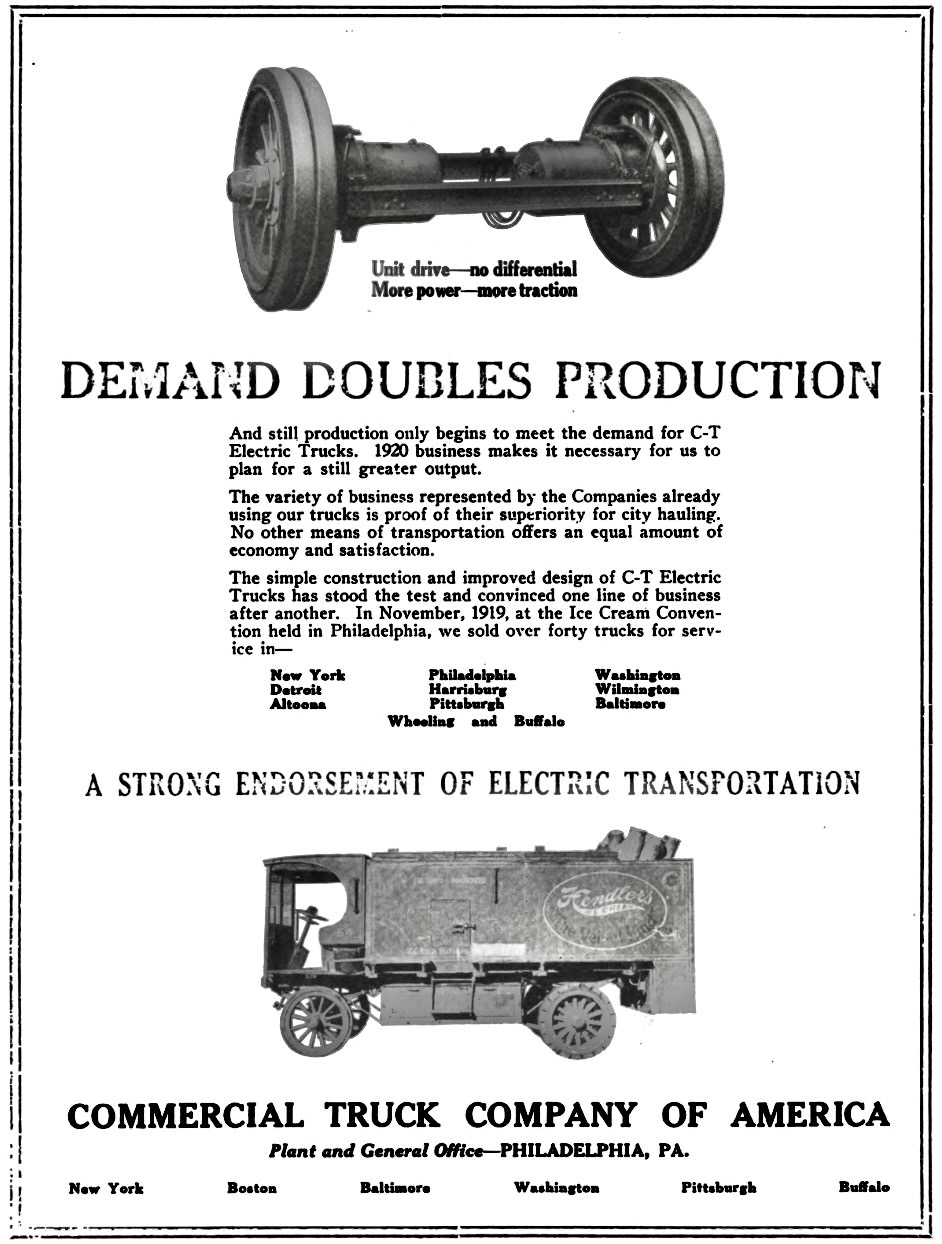
Commercial Truck Company of America (1919) advertisement

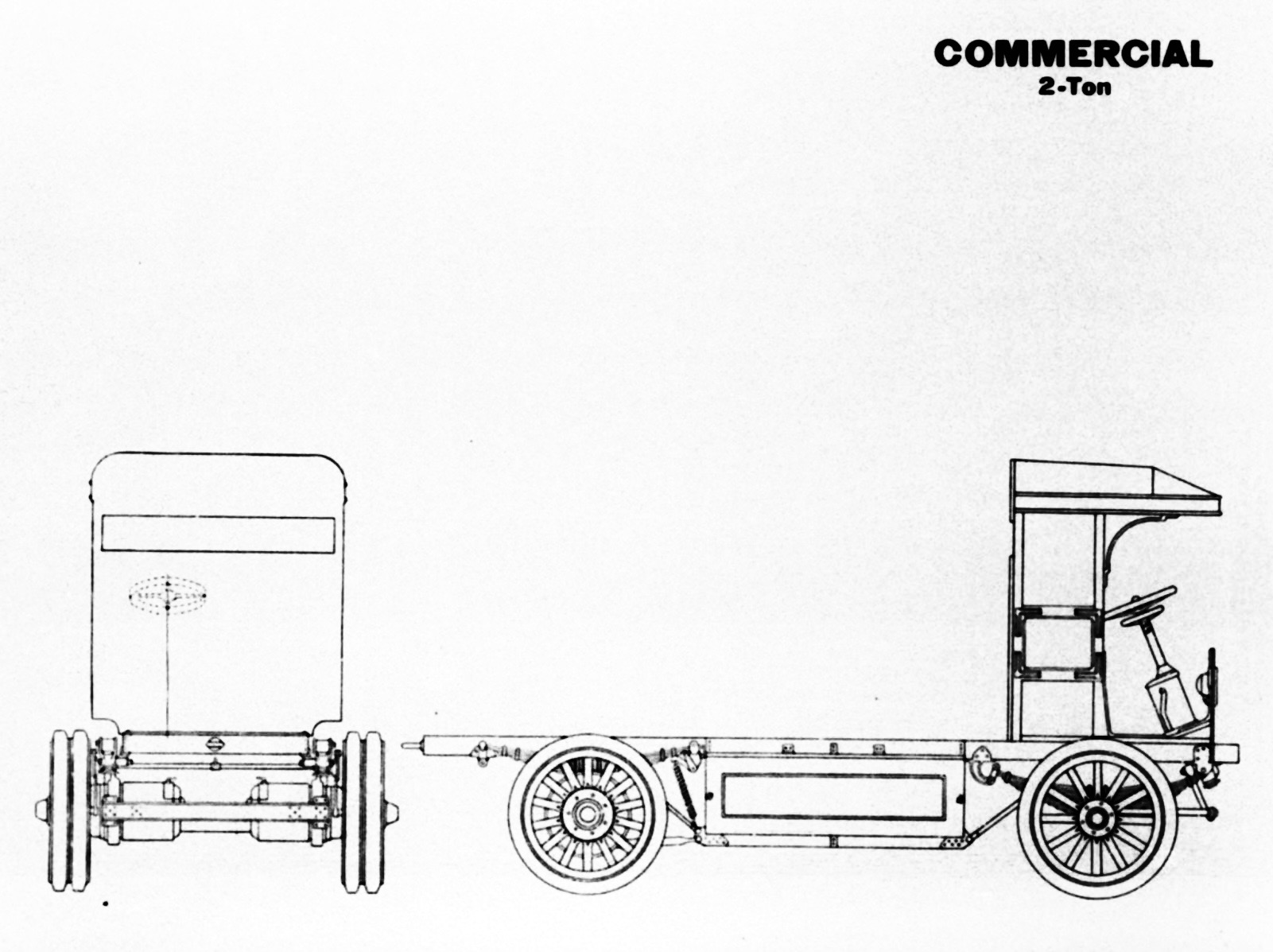
Commercial Truck Company of America (1919) 2 to

The Commercial Truck Company of America started in Philadelphia in 1906. The first vehicle, an electrically powered truck, had four electric motors and was an all-wheel-drive vehicle. In 1920, the vehicle lineup consisted of a 0.5-ton truck, a 1-ton truck, a 2-ton truck, a 3.5-ton truck with only rear-wheel drive, a 3.5-ton truck with all-wheel drive, and a 5-ton truck.

=== Production figures Commercial Truck ===
The pre-assigned serial numbers only indicate the maximum possible production quantity.

Year	Production figures	Model	Load capacity	Serial number
1916	~ 300	H	0,5 to	6901 to 7200
		C	1 to	↑
		D	2 to	↑
		E	3,5 to	↑
		F	5 to	↑
		Front Wheel Drive	5 to	↑
1919			2 to	
1921		BR-1	0,5 to	
		BR-2	1 to	
		BR-4	2 to	
		AK-7	3,5 to	
		AR-6	3 to	
		AR-7	3,5 to	
		Ak-10	5 to	
		AF-10	5 to	
1922	~ 1,000	Bantam	0,5 to	22001 to 23000
		BR 2A	0,75 to	↑
		BR 2	1 to	↑
		BR 4	2 to	↑
		AR 7	3,5 to	↑
		AK 10	5 to	↑
		AR 6	3 to	↑
		AF 10	5 to	↑
		AK 7	3,5 to	↑
1923	~ 1,000	D 1	0,5 to	23001 to 24000
		D 1.5	0,75 to	↑
		D 2	1 to	↑
		B 1.5	0,75 to	↑
		B 2	1 to	↑
		B 4	2 to	↑
		C6	3 to	↑
		C7	3,5 to	↑
		A 7	3,5 to	↑
		A 10	5 to	↑
1924	~ 1,000	D 1	0,5 to	24001 to 25000
		D 1.5	0,75 to	↑
		D 2	1 to	↑
		B 1.5	0,75 to	↑
		B 2	1 to	↑
		B 4	2 to	↑
		C6	3 to	↑
		C7	3,5 to	↑
		A 7	3,5 to	↑
		A 10	5 to	↑
1925	~ 1,000	H 1	0,5 to	25001 to 26000
		H 1.5	0,75 to	↑
		H 2	1 to	↑
		F 1.5	0,75 to	↑
		F 2	1 to	↑
		F 4	2 to	↑
		F 6	3 to	↑
		F 7	3,5 to	↑
		A 7	3,5 to	↑
		A 10	5 to	↑
1926	~ 1,000	H 1	0,5 to	26001 to 27000
		H 1.5	0,75 to	↑
		H 2	1 to	↑
		F 1.5	0,75 to	↑
		F 2	1 to	↑
		F 4	2 to	↑
		F 6	3 to	↑
		F 7	3,5 to	↑
		F 10	5 to	↑
		A 7	3,5 to	↑
		A 10	5 to	↑
1927	~ 1,000	H 1	0,5 to	27001 to 28000
		H 1.5	0,75 to	↑
		H 2	1 to	↑
		F 1.5	0,75 to	↑
		F 2	1 to	↑
		F 4	2 to	↑
		F 6	3 to	↑
		F 7	3,5 to	↑
		F 10	5 to	↑
		F 14	7 to	↑
		A 7	3,5 to	↑
		A 10	5 to	↑
1928	~ 1,000	H 1	0,5 to	28001 to (29000)
		H 1.5	0,75 to	↑
		H 2	1 to	↑
		F 1.5	0,75 to	↑
		F 2	1 to	↑
		F 4	2 to	↑
		F 6	3 to	↑
		F 7	3,5 to	↑
		F 10	5 to	↑
		F 14	7 to	↑
		A 7	3,5 to	↑
		A 10	5 to	↑
