= Ajax Motors Corporation =

Defunct American motor vehicle manufacturer

- Company type: Truck Company
- Industry: Manufacturing
- Founded: 1920; 106 years ago
- Founder: George Lyman Rogers
- Defunct: 1922; 104 years ago
- Headquarters: Boston, US
- Products: Trucks

The Ajax Motors Corporation of Boston, was a truck manufacturer.

== History ==
The Ajax Motors Corporation produced trucks from 1920 to 1922. The company was founded in 1920 with start-up capital of $5,000,000 by George Lyman Rogers, Walter M. Lowney from Boston; Chester I. Campbell from Quincy, Edgar F. Hathaway from Wellesley Hills, and Frank L. Rawson from Portland. The company headquarters was at 15 State Street in Boston. There is no connection to Ajax Motor Vehicle Company. Even no Connection to Ajax Motors Co..

== Products ==
- Model B-I, 22.5 hp, Wheel base 3404 mm, Engine from Weidley 3982 cc, bore 95.25 mm stroke 139.7 mm, $2.250 weight 750 lbs=340 kg
