= De Motte Motor Car Company =

Defunct American motor vehicle manufacturer

- Type: Truck Company, Car Company,
- Industry: Manufacturing
- Founded: 1904; 122 years ago
- Defunct: 1904; 122 years ago
- Headquarters: Valley Forge, Pennsylvania, US
- Products: Trucks , Cars, Boats

The De Motte Motor Car Company of Valley Forge, Pennsylvania, was a truck, car and boat manufacturer.

== History ==
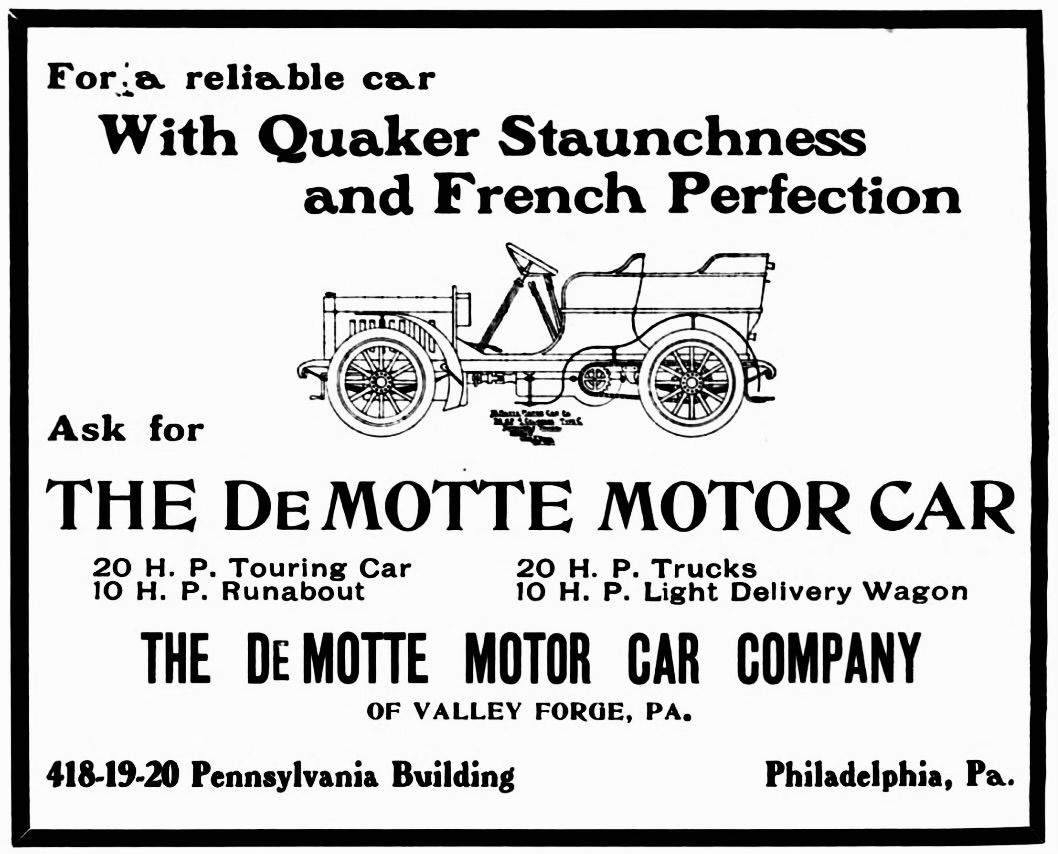
DeMotte advertisement (1904)

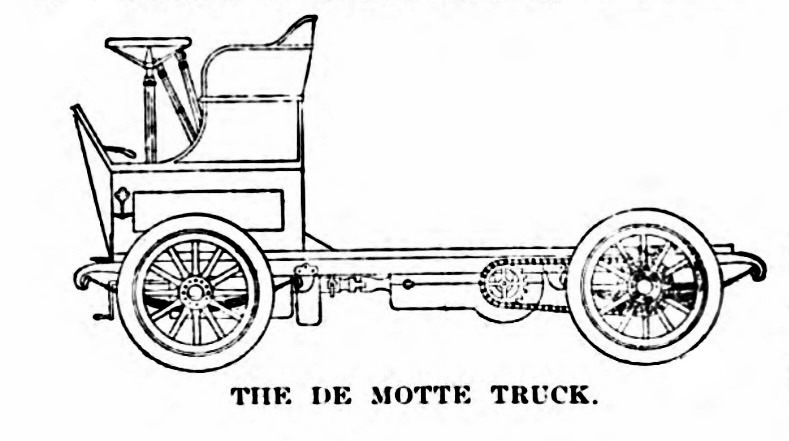
DeMotte truck (1904)

The company was founded in 1904 in Valley Forge, Pennsylvania, and started producing automobiles the same year. The making of boats was planned as well. The starting capital was 300,000 dollars. The brand name was De Motte. The lack of success caused production to stop in the same year.

== Production models ==
- Touring car with 20 hp
  - The wheelbase was 2286 mm
  - Capacity of the tank 75 liter
  - four cylinder engine
  - Price 2200$ to 2500$
  - four or five passenger
  - three speed transmission
  - double chain drive
- Runabout with 10 hp
- Delivery van with 10 hp
  - two cylinder engine
- Truck with 20 to 40 hp
  - four cylinder engine
  - same chassis as the touring car
