= A.D. Meiselbach Motor Wagon Co. =

Defunct American motor vehicle manufacturer

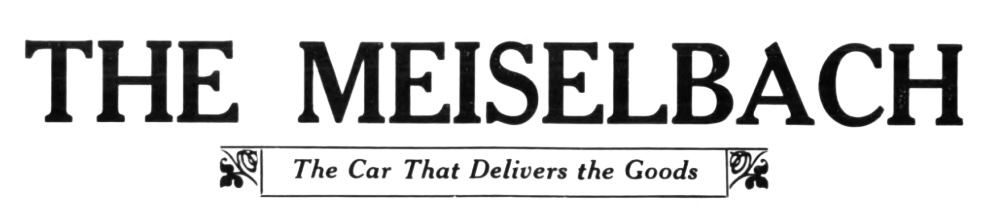
- Company type: Truck Company
- Industry: Manufacturing
- Founded: 1906; 120 years ago
- Founder: A.D. Meiselbach
- Defunct: 1912; 114 years ago
- Headquarters: North Milwaukee, Wisconsin, US
- Products: Trucks

The A.D. Meiselbach Motor Wagon Co. of North Milwaukee, Wisconsin, was a truck manufacturer.

== History ==
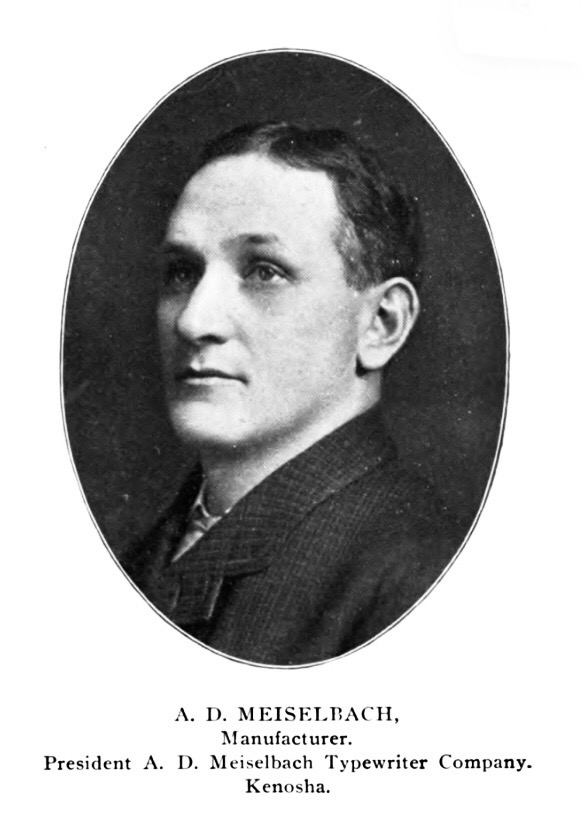
August D. Meiselbach founder of A.D. Meiselbach Motor Wagon Co.

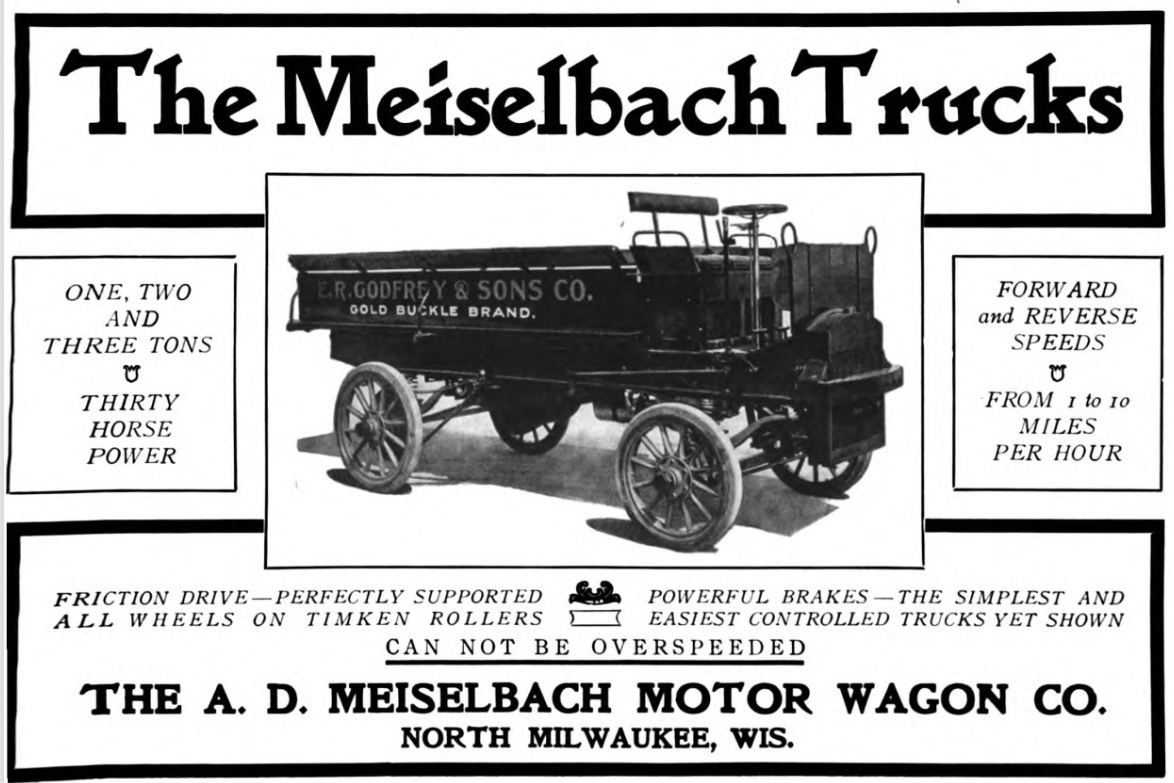
Meiselbach Truck (1907)

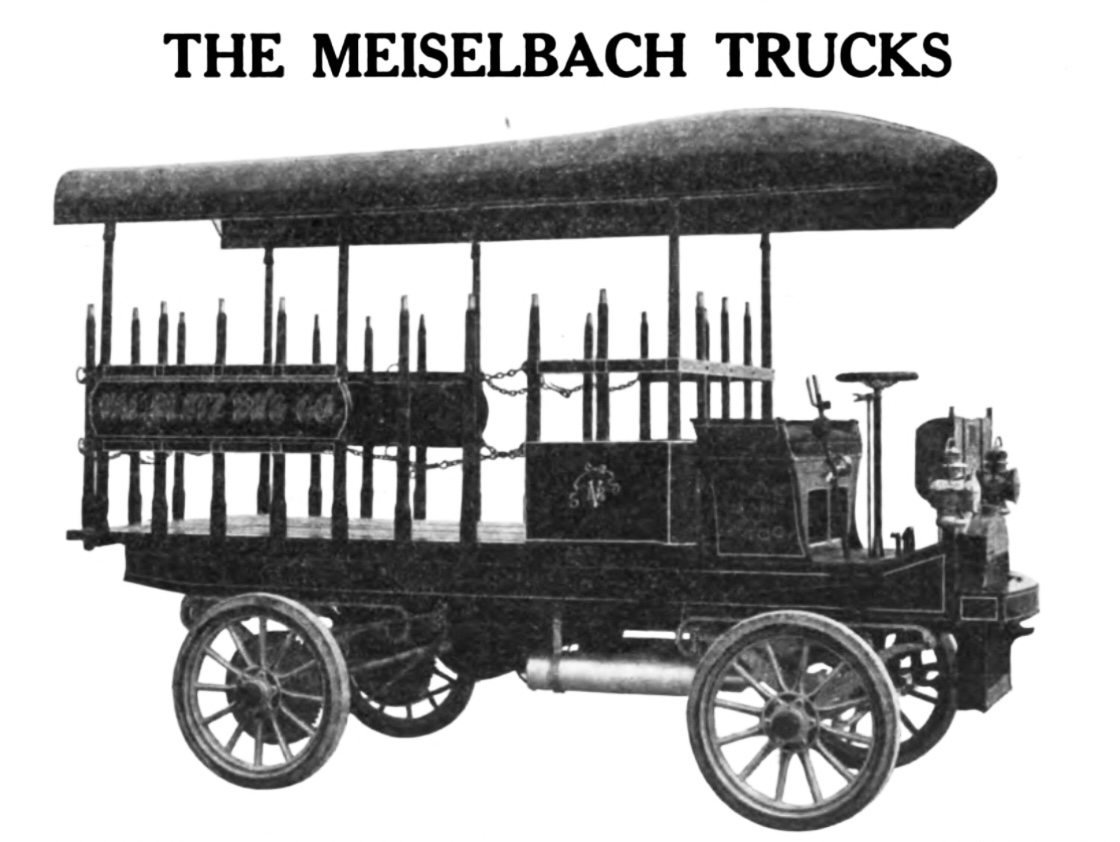
Meiselbach (1908)

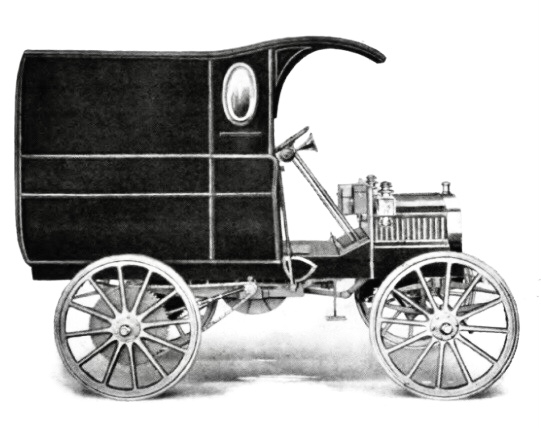
Meiselbach 0.5 t (1910)

In 1907 all Meiselbach vehicles have two-cylinder horizontal gas engines with 4170 cc, 152 mm bore, and 114.3 mm stroke. The engine power is 28 hp. The input gearbox is designed as a double-disc friction gearbox. The engine is mounted transversely to the frame under the driver's seat. The rear wheels are driven via chains. Wheelbase is 2134 mm, 2438 mm or 2743 mm, according to requirements, and tread 1524 mm. The ratio of cones to disks gives maximum working speeds of 10, 8 and 6 miles an hour. In June 1912, the company was taken over by A.O. Smith Co. from Milwaukee.

== Production models ==
In 1906 a 0.5 t was sold. In 1907, a 1 t, a 2 t and a 3 t were sold. In 1910 a 0.5 t was sold.
