= Automotor Company =

American truck manufacturer, 1907–1920

- Company type: Truck Company
- Industry: Manufacturing
- Founded: 1910; 116 years ago
- Founder: F. W. Dickinson
- Defunct: 1912; 114 years ago
- Headquarters: Columbus, Ohio, US
- Products: Trucks

The Automotor Company of Columbus, Ohio, was a truck manufacturer.

== History ==
In spring of 1910, the Automotor Company was founded at 1181 Parsons Avenue, Columbus, Ohio. The starting capital was 50,000 dollars. In addition to the president, F. W. Dickinson, the vice president, William Caskey, should be mentioned. The company was established to manufacture extremely light delivery vehicles. The vehicle consists of two motorcycle frames with a small 5 hp engine. The structure between the two motorcycle frames is designed for a transport load of 1,000 lbs = 0.5 tons. The design was created by the company founder F. W. Dickinson, and the final construction was done by the engineer W. E. L. Beck. The sale of a Minneapolis Big 5 with a two-speed gearbox by the Automotor Company could indicate the motorcycle base of the delivery vehicle.

There is no connection to the company Automotor Company from Hinsdale Smith from 1901 in Springfield, Massachusetts. The brand name here was also Automotor. Production in Springfield ended in 1904.

== Products ==
- 5 hp, 0.5 t
