= Available Truck Co. =

Defunct American motor vehicle manufacturer

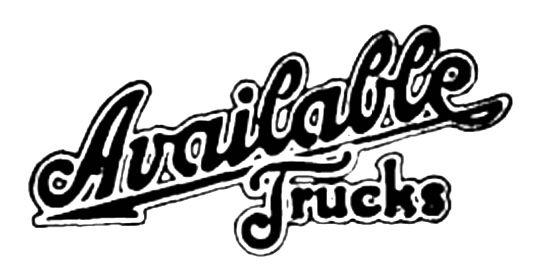
- Company type: Truck Company
- Industry: Manufacturing
- Founded: 1910; 116 years ago
- Defunct: 1957; 69 years ago
- Headquarters: Chicago, Illinois, US
- Products: Trucks

The Available Truck Co. of Chicago, Illinois, was a truck manufacturer.

== History ==
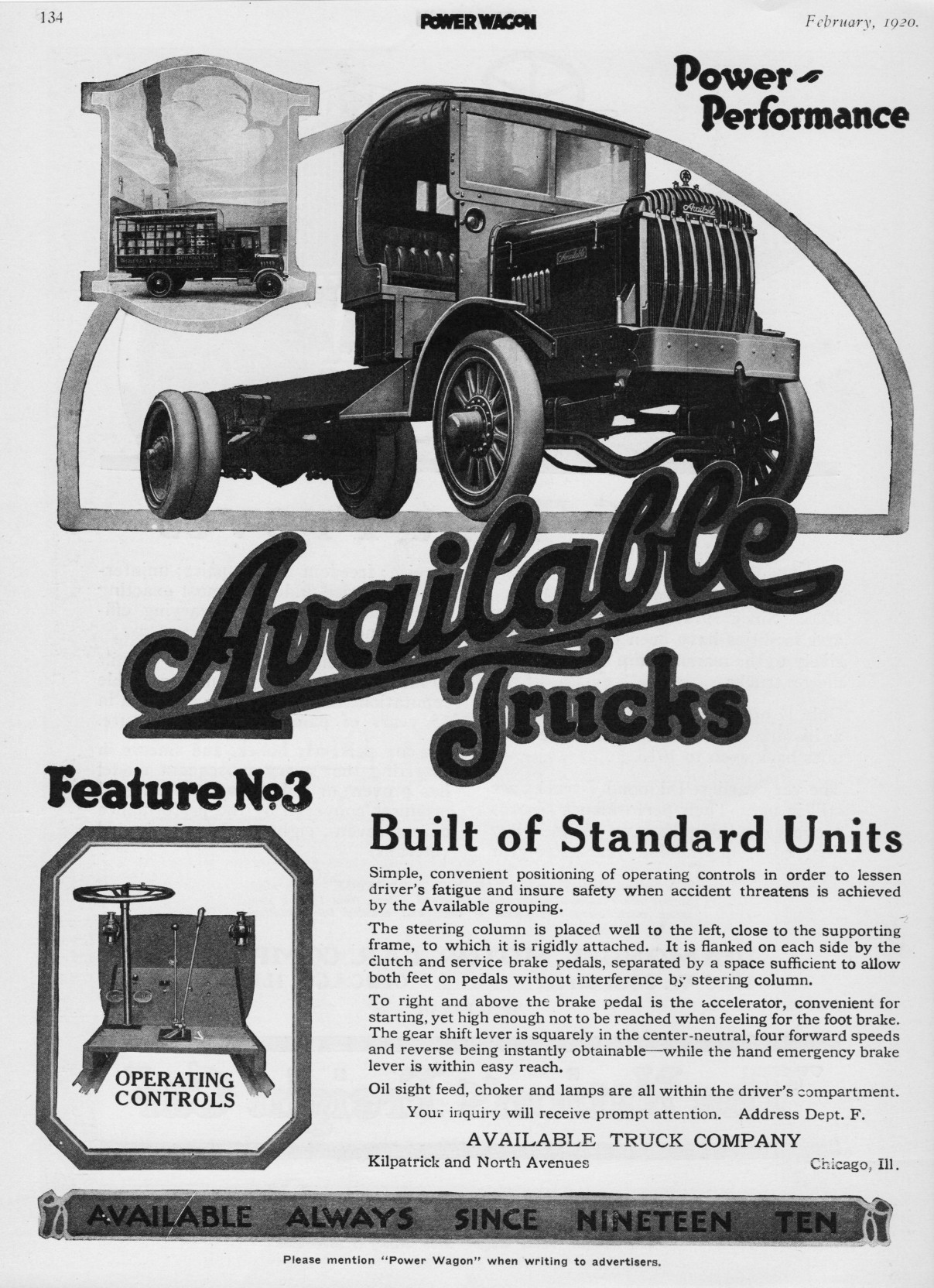
Available Truck Co. ad, 1920

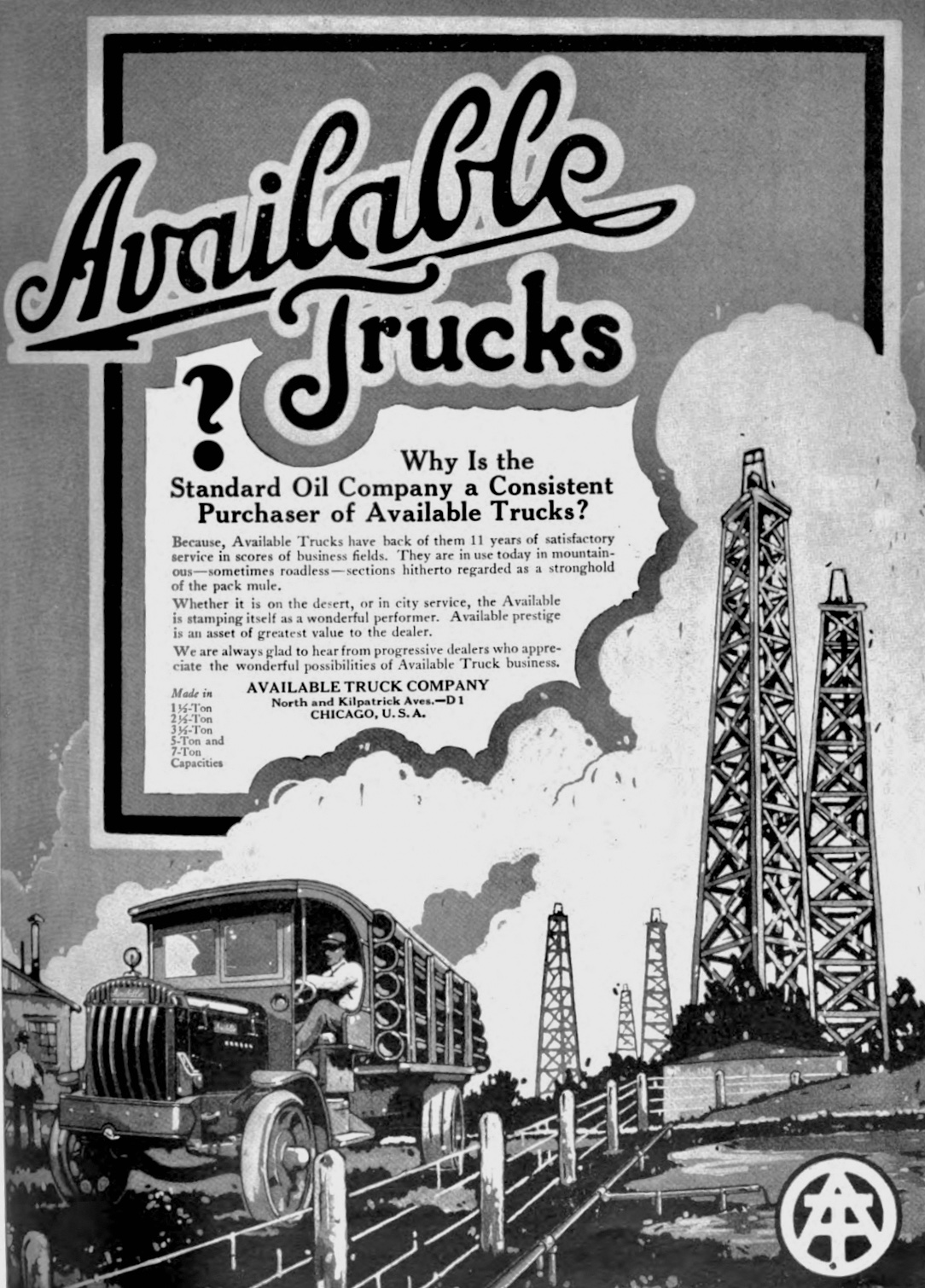
Available Trucks advertisement (1920)

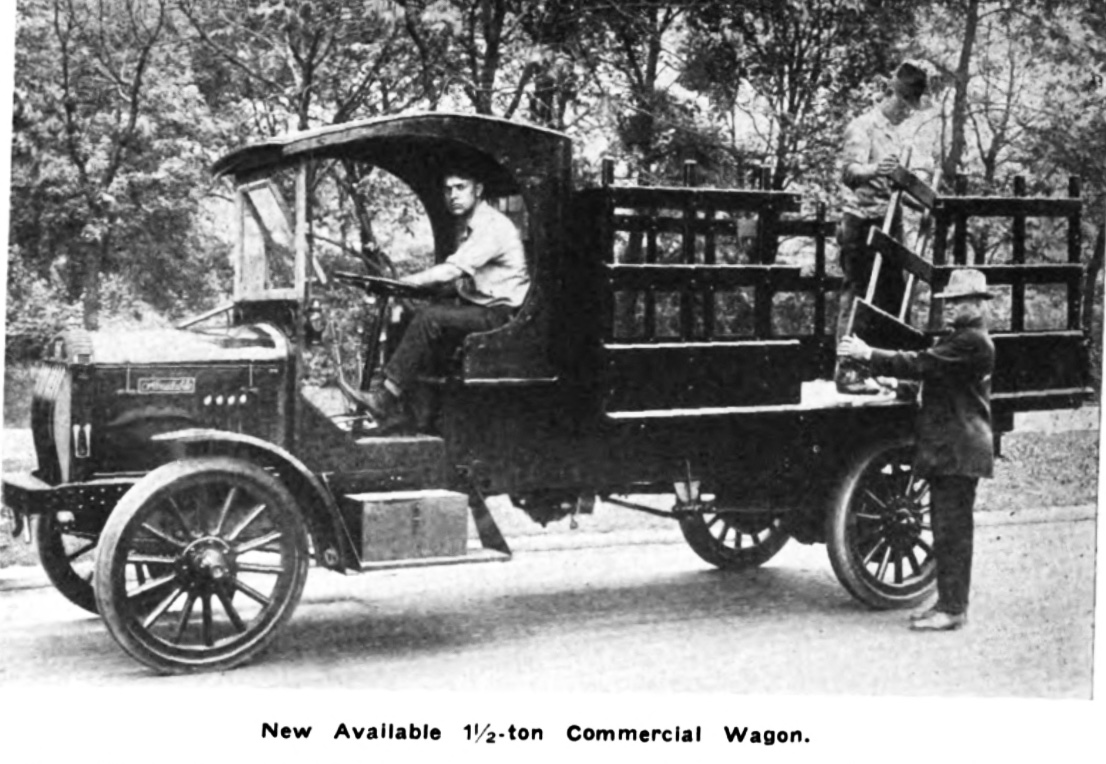
Available H1 (1920)

The company, founded 1910, in Chicago, Illinois, manufactured trucks under the brand name Available.

== Production Models ==
In 1917 The models

- A1; 2000 lbs = 900 kg ; $1.950; 3.620 cc; 18 m.p.h; 3.353 mm wheel base
- B2; 4000 lbs = 1.800 kg ; $2.650; 4.599 cc; 15 m.p.h; 3658 mm wheel base
- C3; 7000 lbs = 3.200 kg ; $3.650; 5.734 cc; 14 m.p.h.
- D5; 10000 lbs = 4.500 kg; $4.600; 5.734 cc; 12 m.p.h.; 4.267 mm wheel base

were available.

In 1920

- H2
- H3
- H5
- H7
