= Bailey-Carroll & Kline Co. =

Defunct American motor vehicle manufacturer

- Company type: Truck and Car Company
- Industry: Manufacturing
- Founded: 1909; 117 years ago
- Defunct: 1914; 112 years ago
- Headquarters: York, Pennsylvania, US
- Products: Trucks ; Automobiles

Bailey-Carroll & Kline Co. of York, Pennsylvania, was a car and truck manufacturer.

== History ==
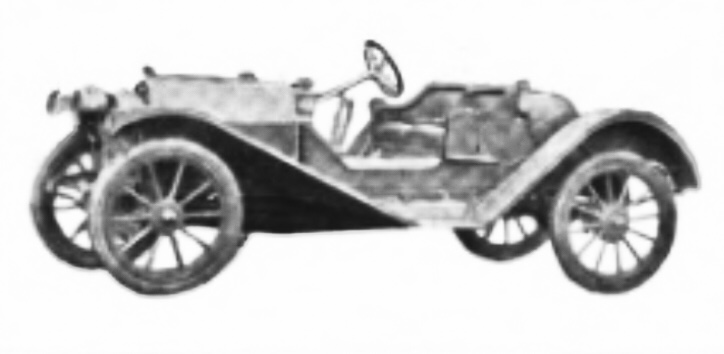
Kline Model 4-24 Meteor (1911)

The company, founded in 1909 in York, Pennsylvania, manufactured trucks and cars under the brand name Kline. The company was also known under the abbreviation B.C.K. Motor Car Co. In 1911, the Roadster Model 4-24 was available for purchase. The four-cylinder engine had a displacement of 3077 cc with a bore of 95.25 mm and a stroke of 107.95 mm. The engine produced 24 hp. The transmission had three gears. Also in 1911, a small delivery van with a capacity of 1,250 lbs (0.6 t) was available. He had a two-cylinder engine with 16 horsepower. The gearbox had two gears. The wheelbase was 2184 mm and the track width 1422 mm.
