= Johann Senn von Münsingen =

Bishop of Basel (c. 1308–1365)

- Bishop of Basel
- Church: Catholic Church
- Elected: 1335
- Term ended: 1365
- Previous posts: Provost of St. Victor, Mainz; canon of Konstanz and Basel

Orders
- Consecration: 1336 in Avignon

Personal details
- Born: c. 1308
- Died: 30 June 1365 Basel Minster

Johann Senn von Münsingen (c. 1308 – 30 June 1365) was a Swiss Catholic prelate who served as Bishop of Basel from 1335 until his death.

== Biography ==
A member of the Senn von Münsingen family, Johann was the son of the knight Burkhard and of Johanna von Buchegg. In 1325 he became provost of the collegiate church of St. Victor in Mainz, thanks to the support of his uncle Matthias von Buchegg, Archbishop of Mainz, and from 1326 to 1328 he studied law at Bologna. By 1334 at the latest he was a canon of Konstanz and Basel.

At the instigation of another uncle, Berthold von Buchegg, Bishop of Strasbourg, Johann was elected Bishop of Basel by the Basel chapter in 1335 and consecrated the following year at Avignon, probably owing to the influence of a third uncle, Hugo von Buchegg. In 1337 he granted the Basel craftsmen the right to sit on the council. He promoted the veneration of Emperor Henry II, whose relics arrived in Basel in 1347. In the disputes over the papal interdict on the Empire, he took an anti-Wittelsbach course but sought to avoid conflict.

== Bibliography ==
- Helvetia Sacra I/1, 187 f.
- J. Schmutz, Juristen für das Reich, 2, 2000, 598
- Gatz, Die Bischöfe des Heiligen Römischen Reiches, 63 f.
