= Buda Engine Co. =

American engine manufacturer

Buda Engine Company
- Industry: Engine manufacturing
- Founded: 1881 in Buda, Illinois
- Founder: George Chalender
- Fate: Acquired by Allis-Chalmers in 1953

Buda Engine was founded in 1881 by George Chalender in Buda, Illinois, to make equipment for railways. Later based in Harvey, Illinois, Buda from 1910 manufactured engines for industrial, truck, and marine applications. Early Buda engines were gasoline fueled. Later, diesel engines were introduced, utilizing proprietary Lanova cylinder head designs, injection pumps and nozzles. These were known as Buda-Lanova diesel engines. Buda Engine Company was acquired by Allis-Chalmers in 1953. The Buda-Lanova models were re-christened "Allis-Chalmers diesel".

Buda began by manufacturing railroad maintenance of way tools and equipment, switches, switch stands and signal devices. By the end of the century, Buda was producing a line of hand cars and velocipedes, and eventually moved into the motorcar business also. Velocipedes were equipped with single-cylinder, air-cooled engines and motorcars were equipped with 2-cylinder opposed "pancake" air-cooled engines. The motorcar production was later either sold or licensed to Fairbanks-Morse, which continued production. Truck, tractor, bus, and marine engines continued in production by Buda who eventually was taken over by Allis-Chalmers.

Buda's engines were water-cooled, in-line four, six, or eight-cylinder models. Buda advertisements in the early 1900s proclaimed Buda as "Pioneer of the cast-in-block" method. Their engines featured long stroke, enclosed valves, noiseless timing gears, and self-contained oiling system. Early four-cylinder gasoline-fueled models produced 30 to 60 bhp. Later six-cylinder diesel Buda-Lanova engines exceeded 200 bhp.

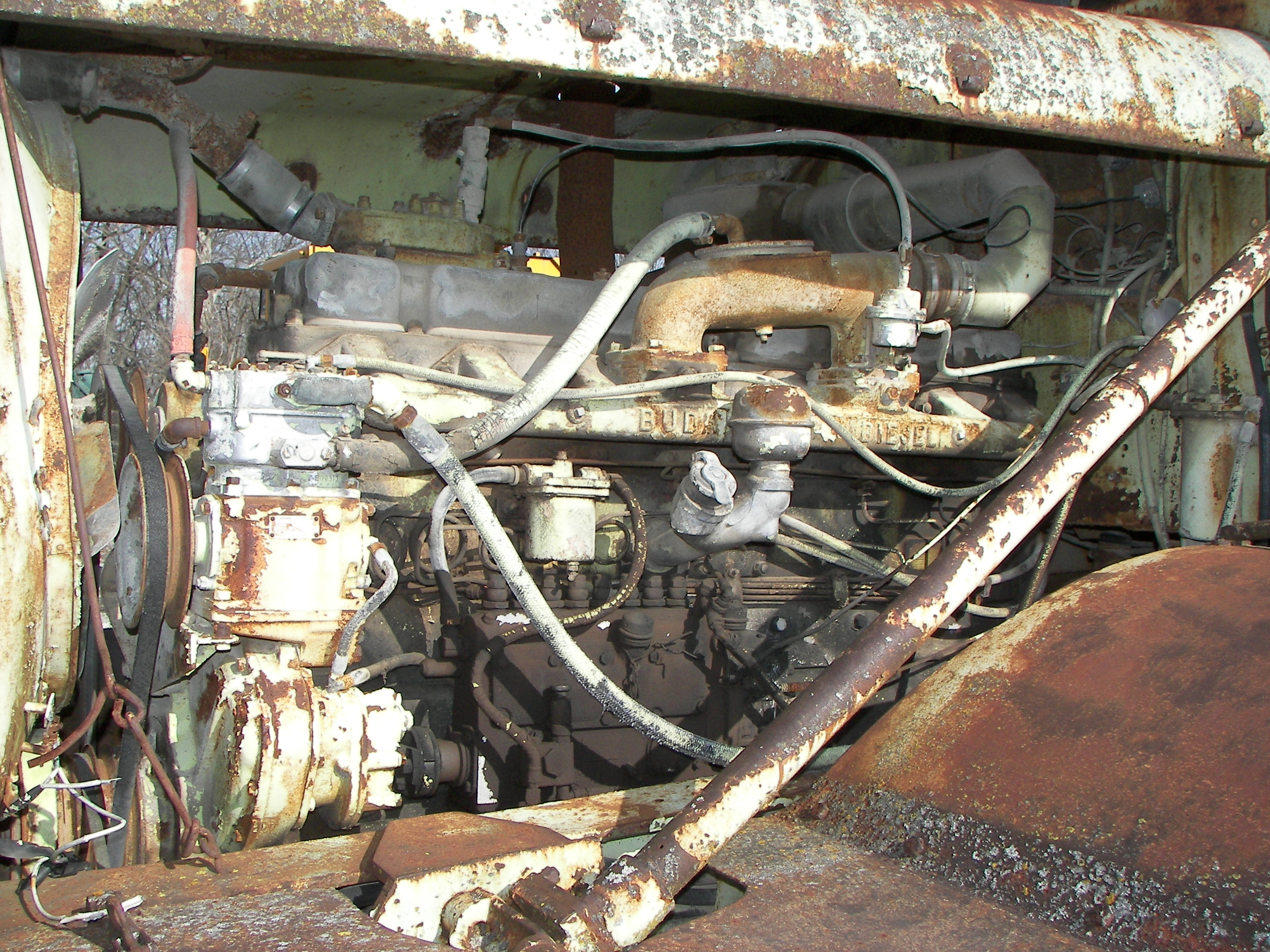
Old Buda 8-cylinder Diesel engine

Their principal competitors were Hercules, Waukesha, Continental Motors, Wisconsin, Lycoming, Rutenber, Hall-Scott, LeRoi, Weidely, and Herschell-Spillman.

The four-cylinder Buda gasoline engine was favored by many early truck manufacturers, who were converting horse-drawn vehicles to self-propelled models. In 1918 a 42-hp version was fitted to the American-built M1917 light tank, a licensed copy of the Renault FT. By the late 1920s, trucks were getting larger and required larger engines, such as Buda's six-cylinder models. As diesel engines grew in popularity in the 1930s, Buda responded with four and six-cylinder diesel engines.

A Buda six-cylinder engine was one of the offerings in the Carroll Six (1920–1922). The 66 hp engine's top speed was 62 mph/100 km/h.

== Users ==
Kenworth's early models (1922–1925) featured Buda four-cylinder gasoline engines as standard equipment. Buda six-cylinder gasoline engines were offered by Kenworth until the late 1930s. Other truck manufacturers that used Buda engines include:

- ACE (Newark 1918-1927)
- Acorn (made in Chicago 1924–1931)
- Air-O-Flex (Detroit 1919–1920)
- Armleder (Cincinnati 1909–1936)
- Atco (Kankakee, IL 1920–1923)
- Barber (New York City 1917–1918)
- Bell (Ottumwa, IA 1919–1923)
- Betz (Hammond, IN 1919–1929)
- Brown (St Cloud & Duluth, MN 1922–1924)
- Clydesdale (Clyde, OH 1917–1939)
- Cockshutt Plow Company (Ontario, CA)
- Coleman (Littleton, CO 1925–1943)
- Columbia (Pontiac, MI 1916–1925)
- Commerce (Detroit 1917–1932)
- Concord (Concord, NH 1917–1933)
- Day-Elder (Irvington, NJ 1919–1937)
- Dearborn (Chicago 1919–1924)
- Dependable (East St Louis, IL 1918–1923)
- Double Drive (Benton Harbor, MI 1922–1930)
- Douglas (Omaha 1917–1931)
- Durant-Dort Carriage Company "Flint" (1915–1916)
- Eagle (St Louis 1920–1928)
- Fremont-Mais (Fremont OH 1914–1915)
- Fulton (Farmingdale, NY 1916–1925)
- Gary Motor Truck (Gary, IN 1916–1927)
- Gotfredson (Detroit, Michigan & Walkerville, Ontario 1923–1948)
- Hawkeye Truck (Sioux City, IA 1915–1933)
- Hug (Highland, IL 1921–1942)
- Hurlburt (New York City 1912–1927)
- International Harvester (1925-195?)
- Jeffery (Kenosha, WI 1913–1917)
- Jumbo (Saginaw, MI 1918–1924)
- Kalamazoo (Kalamazoo, MI 1913–1924)
- Keystone Motor Truck Corporation (Oaks, Pennsylvania, 1919–1923)
- Kleiber (San Francisco 1914–1937)
- LaPlant-Choate (1911–1952)
- Lehigh (Allentown, PA 1925–1927)
- Maccar (Allentown, PA 1914–1935)
- MacDonald (San Francisco 1920–1942)
- Nash (Kenosha, WI 1917–1929)
- Arthur Rehberger & Son Newark, N.J. (1923-1938)
- Relay (Lima, OH 1927–1933)
- Rogers Una-Drive (Sunnyvale, CA 1919–1922)
- Rumely (LaPorte, IN 1919–1928)
- Sandow (Chicago Heights, IL 1915–1928)
- Service (Wabash, IN 1911–1926)
- Sisu (Finland 1938–1941)
- Stewart (Buffalo, NY 1912–1941)
- Sullivan (Rochester, NY 1916–1923)
- Thomas (New York City 1916–1917)
- Tiffin (Tiffin, OH 1913–1923)
- Titan (Milwaukee 1917–1932)
- Trabold (Johnstown, PA 1911–1932)
- Transport (Mt Pleasant, MI 1919–1925)
- Traylor (Allentown, PA 1920–1928)
- Twin City Trucks (1918-?)
- Walker-Johnson (East Woburn, MA 1919–1923)
- Watson (Conestoga, NY 1917–1925).

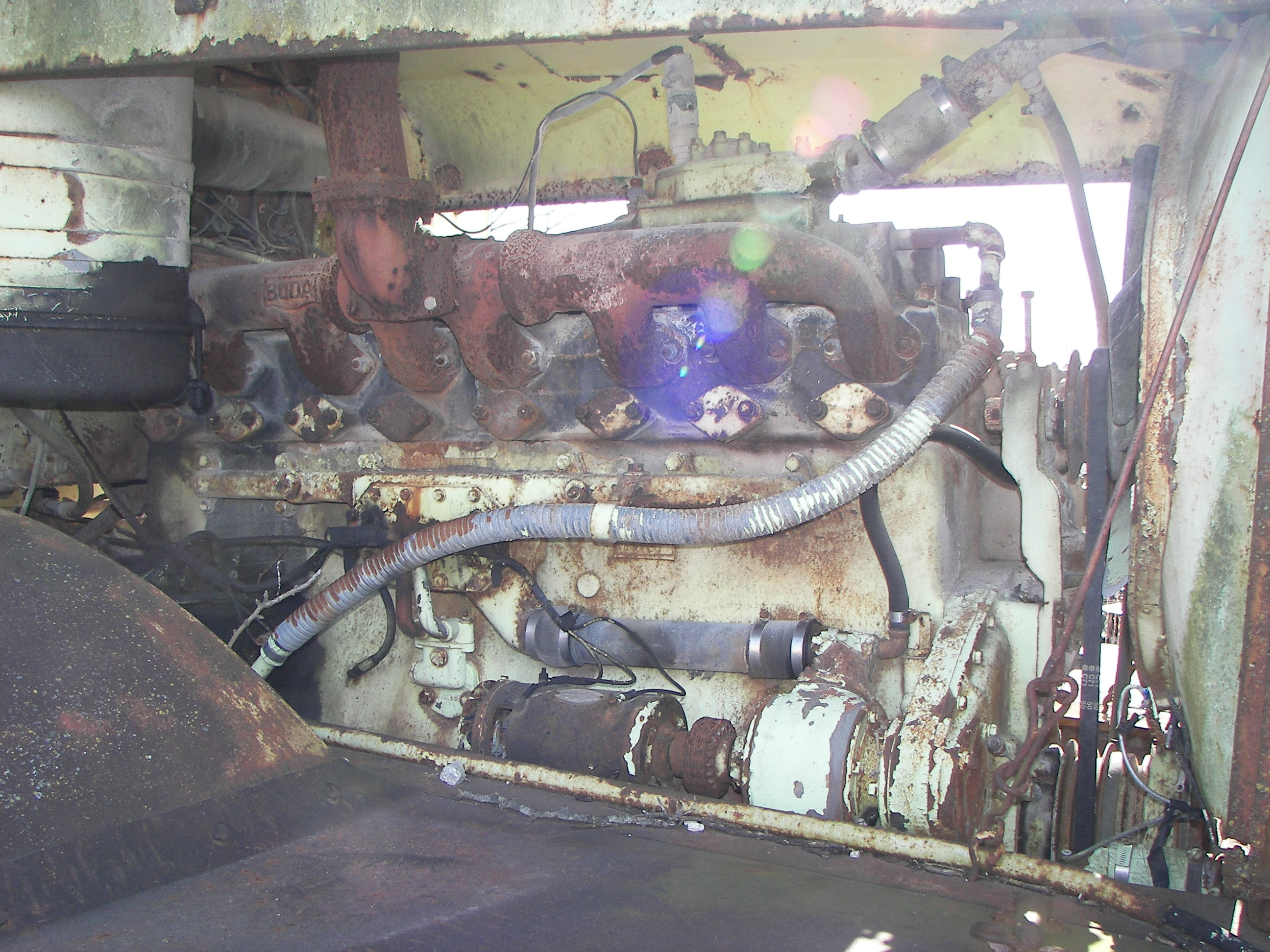
Old Buda 8-cylinder Diesel engine

Buda-Lanova engines were also used by the Whitcomb Locomotive Works of Rochelle IL. Two Buda-Lanova model DCS 1879 6 cylinder supercharged Diesel engines (6.75 bore x 8.75 stroke, 325 hp @ 1,200 rpm) were installed in both 65-DE-14a and 65-DE-19a Diesel electric centercab locomotives that were purchased by the Army and shipped over to Africa and Europe during WW II, helping Whitcomb to earn the Army-Navy "E" award. These engines suffered from poor cooling and cracking in the cylinder heads and resulted in many locomotives being disabled while waiting for new heads.

Chicago-based Condor offered Buda-Lanova diesels in their 1939 & 1940 trucks. Ag-tractor manufacturers, such as Massey-Harris (see Massey Ferguson), Cockshutt, and Oliver used Buda engines. Bus, taxi, and motorcoach makers such as Bridgeport, Luxor, and Pennant (see Barley Motor Car Co.) all used Buda engines. From 1925 to 1930, California coach operator, El Dorado, re-fitted new four-cylinder White buses with six-cylinder Budas. Firetruck builders Seagrave Fire Apparatus, Duplex, and American LaFrance used Buda engines. Buda engines were also used in electric generators, fire pumps, sawmills, cotton gins, and feed mills. Gardner-Denver used Buda engines in their air compressors. Buda-Lanova diesels were used by Australian Navy and U.S. Coast Guard in the 1940s.

Parts were available from Buda Engine Company in Shreveport, LA, till Owner Jim Cousins' passing in the early 2000s. After his passing, his family scrapped the rest of the inventory facing pressure to vacate the warehouse. Since then, most of the flathead-era Pre-WWII Buda parts have become impossible to source.

One vessel used by the Australian Navy in WW2, HDML 1321 is still afloat and working as a tourist dive boat based in Darwin.

HDML 1321 is now the subject of a restoration venture aimed at purchasing and restoring the vessel to its wartime configuration. An inspection of the vessel in 2016 found the hull in excellent condition and the original two Buda diesels still functioning, although one is slightly down on power due to wear of the original cylinder liners.

== See also ==
- Guiberson A-1020
