= Iowa Motor Truck Co. =

Defunct American motor vehicle manufacturer

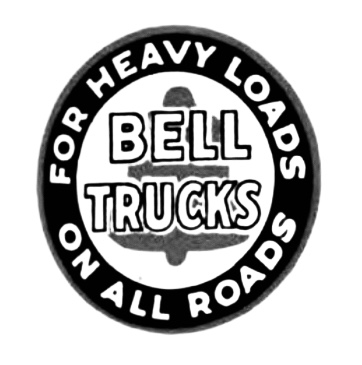
- Type: Truck Company
- Industry: Manufacturing
- Founded: 1915; 111 years ago
- Founder: Mr. Bell
- Defunct: 1923; 103 years ago
- Headquarters: Ottumwa, Iowa, US
- Products: Trucks

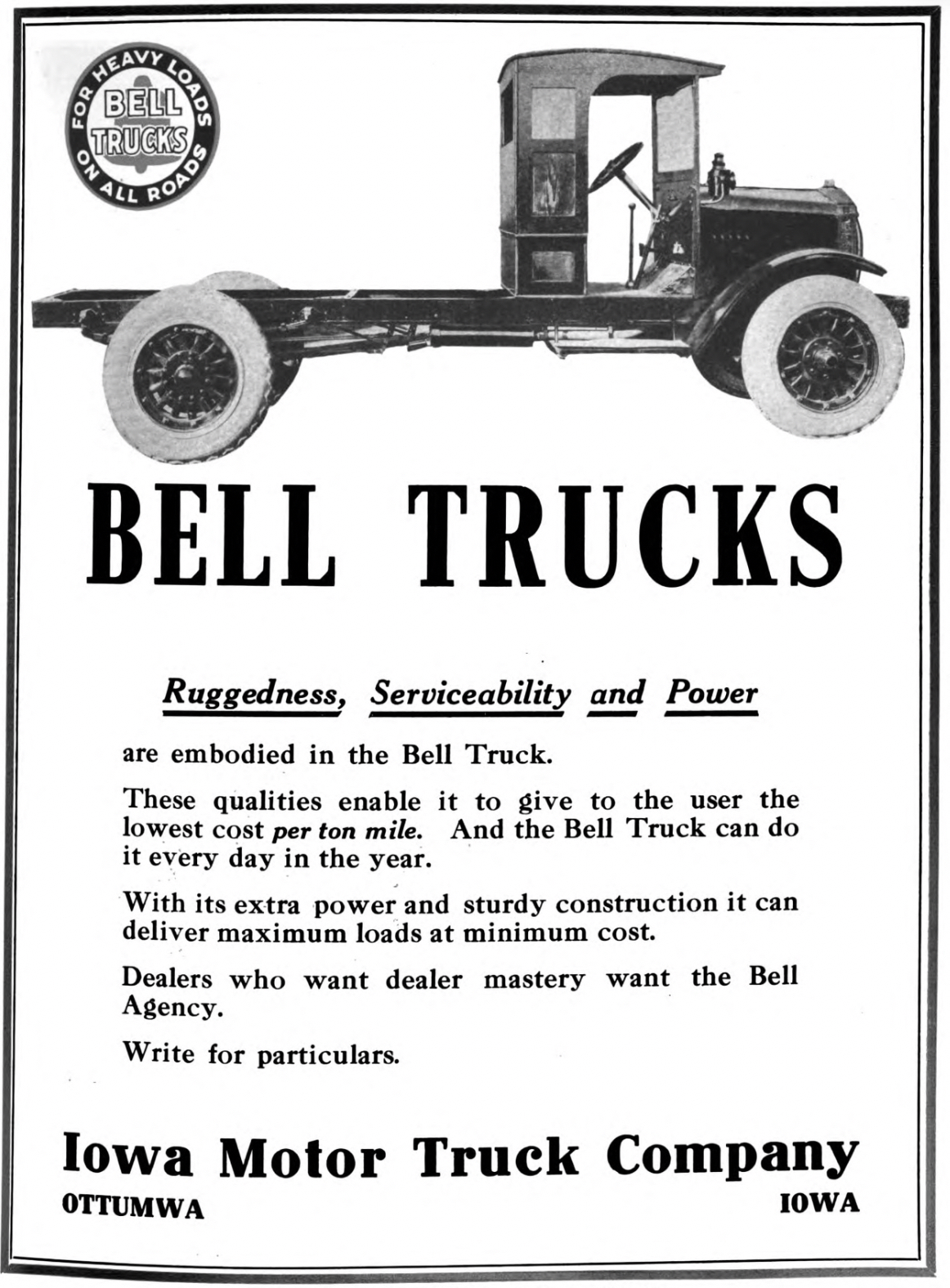
Bell advertisement (1920)

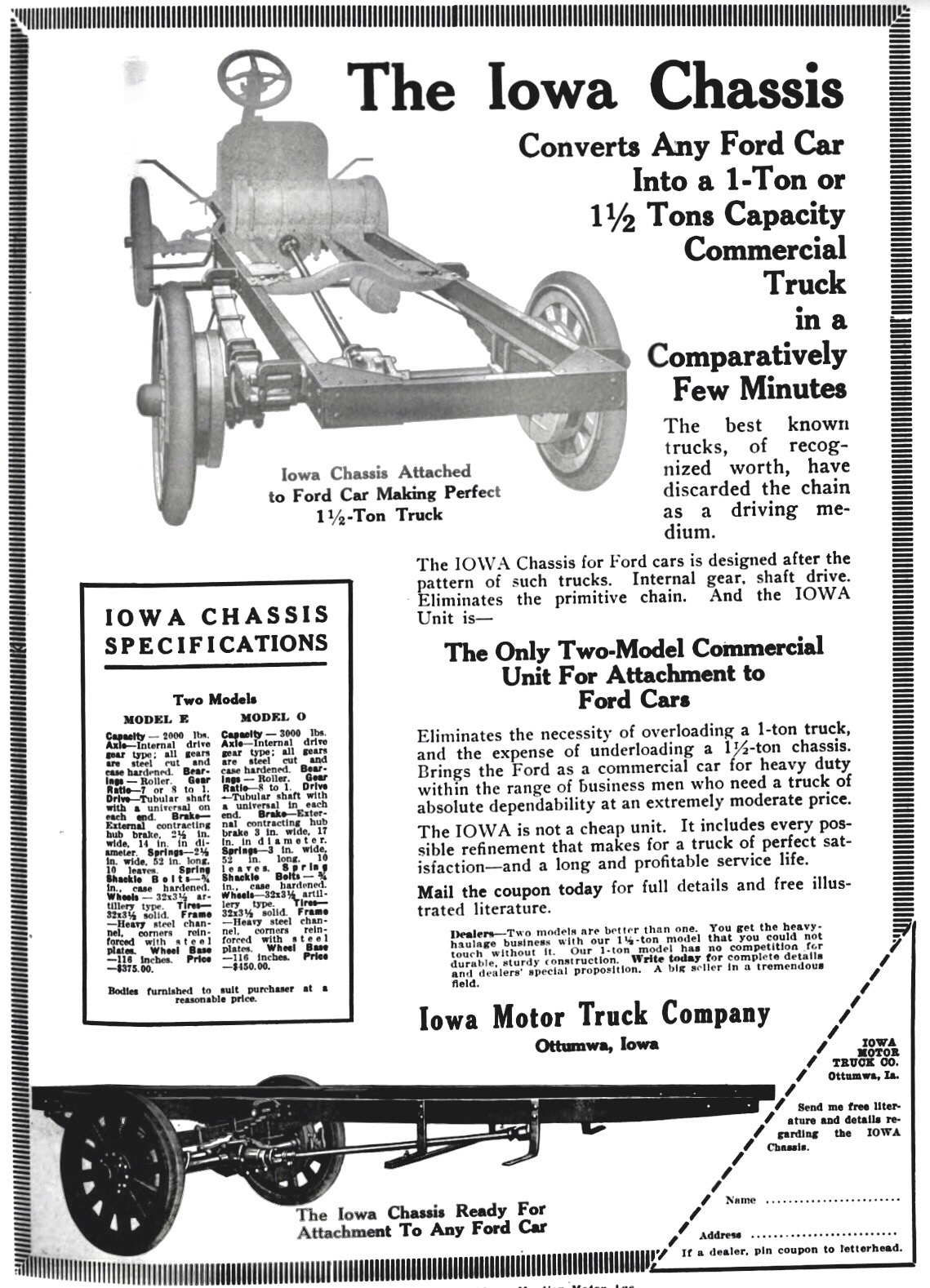
Iowa Motor Truck Co. Chassis (1916)

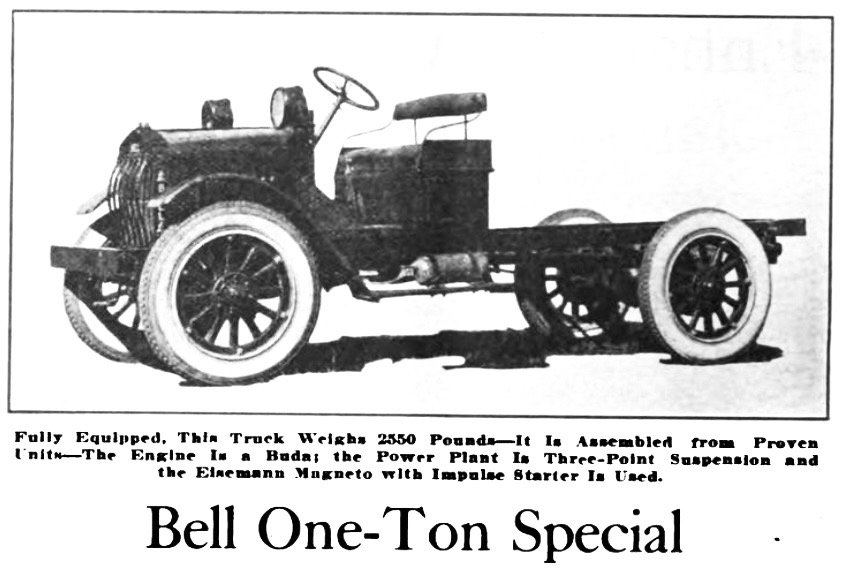
Bell Model E Special (1919-1923) 1-1,5 to

The Iowa Motor Truck Co. of Ottumwa, Iowa, was a truck manufacturer.

== History ==
The Iowa Motor Truck Co. produced light trucks under the brand Bell. The Iowa Motor Truck Company was founded on December 4, 1915. Before the Iowa Motor Truck Co. started delivering its own trucks from 1919, it already provided conversion kits in 1916 to turn Ford vehicles into trucks. These chassis were already called the same as the later own trucks, Model E and Model O. In 1919, the Model E with 1.5 tons and the Model O with 2 tons were produced. The engines came from the company Buda. The Model E used a four-cylinder engine with 3801 cc. The bore was 95.25 mm and the stroke 133.35 mm. The 1.5-ton had a wheelbase of 3708 mm. The transmission had three gears. The Model O had an engine displacement of 5343 cc with a bore of 114.3 mm and a stroke of 130.175 mm.

=== Production figures Bell trucks ===
The pre-assigned serial numbers only indicate the maximum possible production quantity.

Year	Production figures	Model	Load capacity	Serial number
1919	36	E	1,5 to	4875 to 4910
1919	295	O	2 to	1001 to 1295
1920	202	E	1,5 to	4910 to 5112
1920	199	O	2,5 to	1295 to 1494
1921		E	1,5 to	
1921		O	2,5 to	
1921		M	1 to	11205 to
1922		E	1,5 to	
1923		E	1,5 to	
Sum				
