= Acorn Motor Car Co. =

Defunct American motor vehicle manufacturer

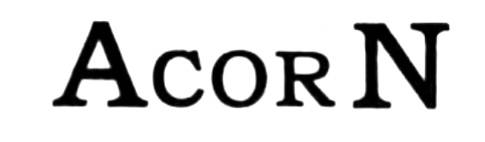
- Type: Truck Company
- Industry: Manufacturing
- Founded: 1909; 117 years ago
- Defunct: 1912; 114 years ago
- Headquarters: Cincinnati, US
- Products: Trucks

The Acorn Motor Car Co. of Cincinnati, was a truck manufacturer.

== History ==
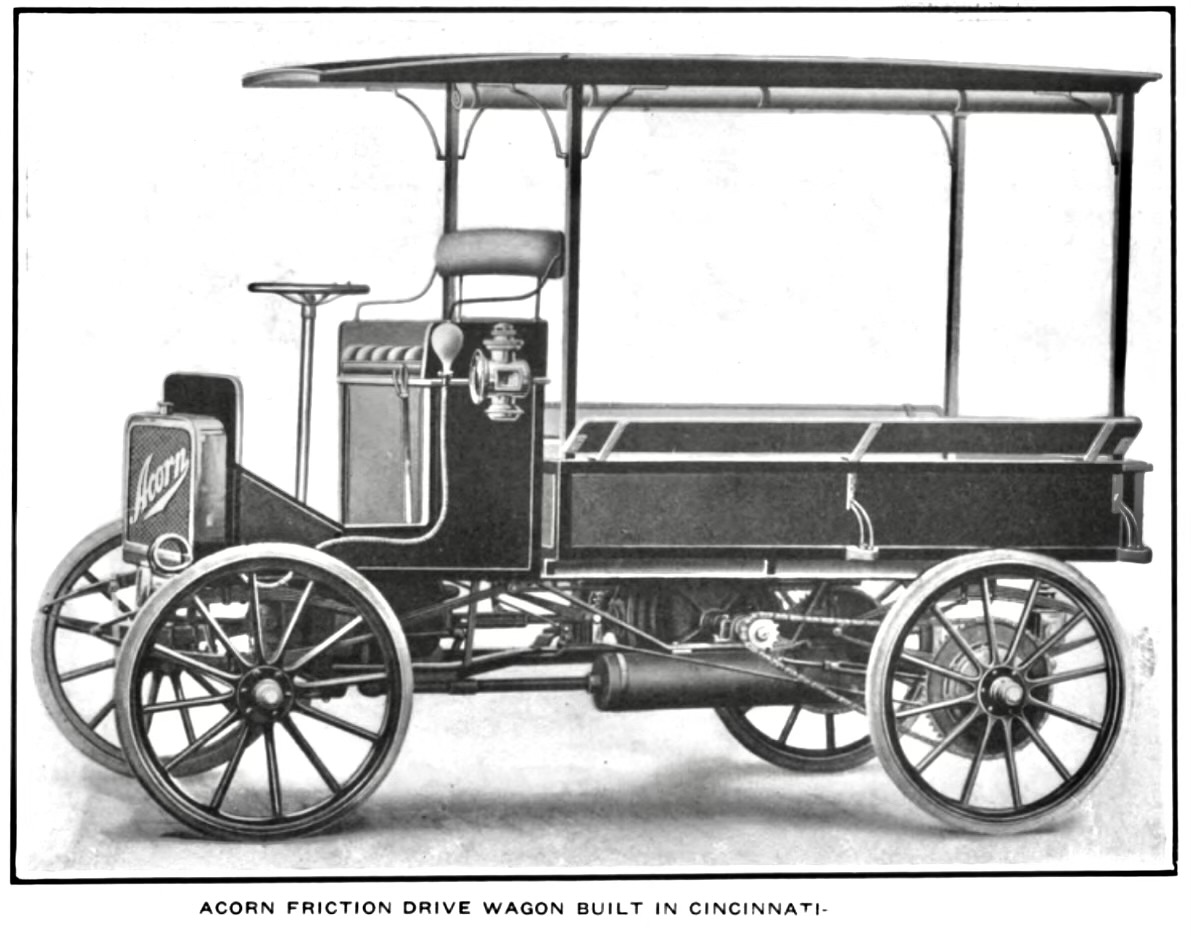
Acorn Model F (1910-1912) friction drive

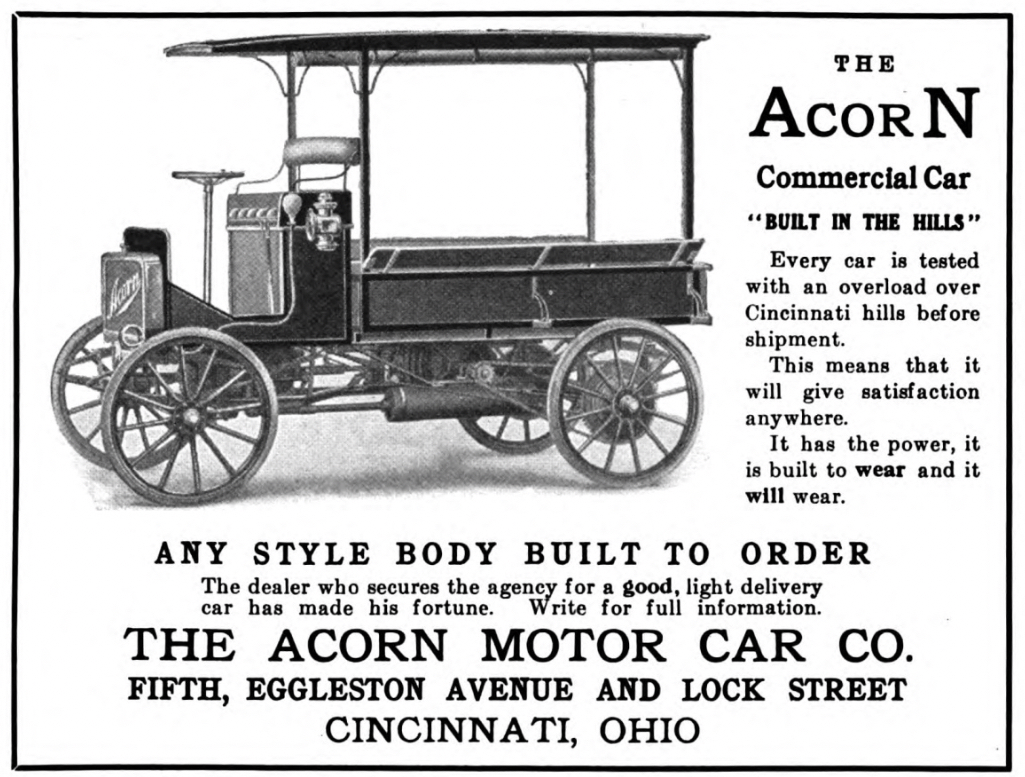
Acorn Advertisement (1910)

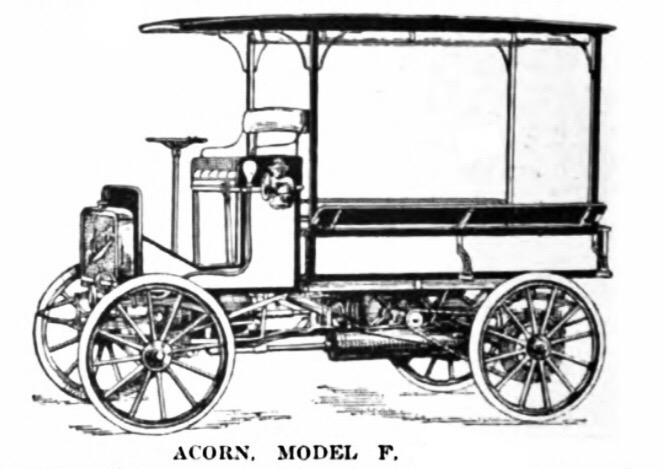
Acorn Model F (1910-1912)

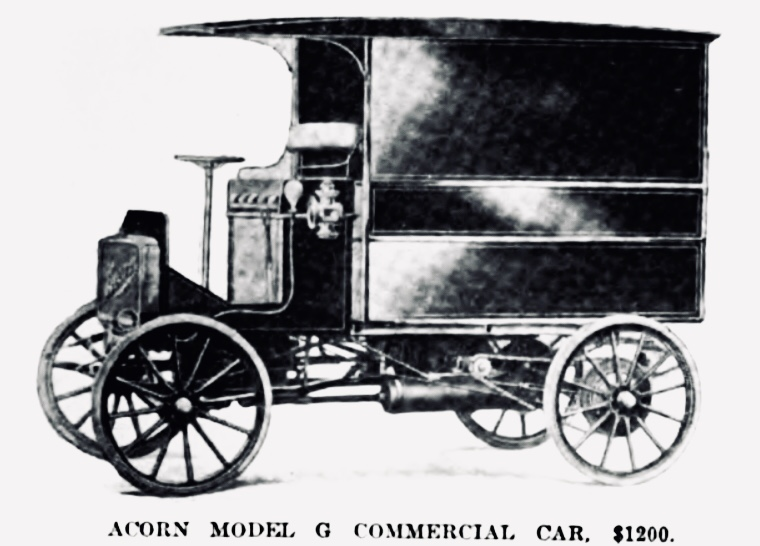
Acorn Model G (1910-1912)

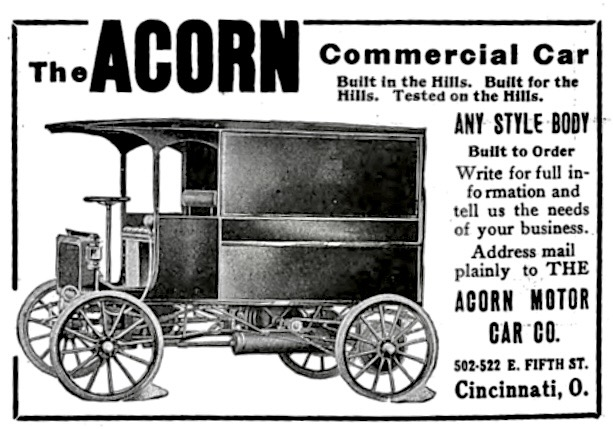
Acorn Model G advertisement (1910-1912)

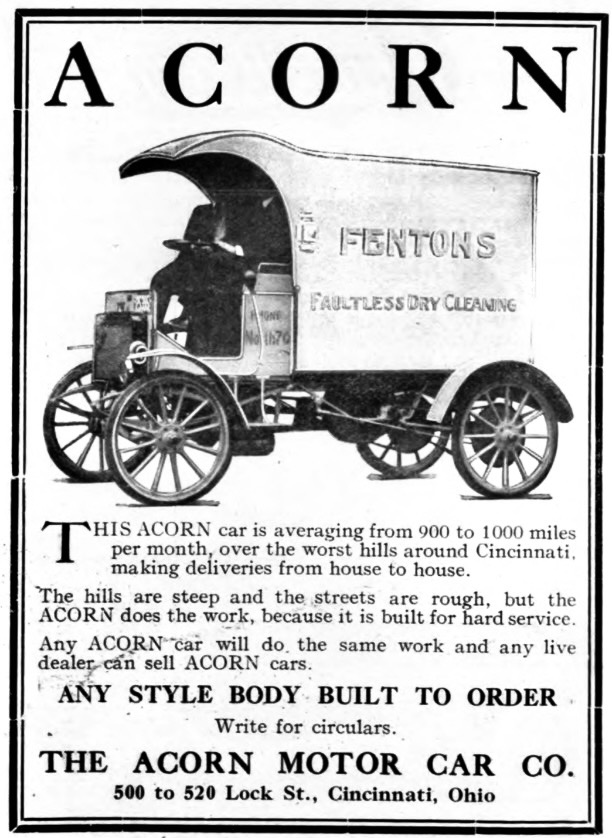
Acorn advertisement (1910)

The company, founded in 1909 in Cincinnati, Ohio, manufactured light trucks under the brand name Acorn. In July 1909, the production of the first vehicles was started. The production sites were located on Eggelstone Avenue and Lock Street. The company's slogan was: "Built in the Hills. Built for the Hills. Tested on the Hills." The Model F and Model G were produced from 1909 to 1912. The Model F had a payload of 1000 lbs, corresponding to 450 kg. The two-cylinder opposed-piston engine had a displacement of 2574 cc with a bore of 127 mm and a stroke of 101.6 mm. The engine output was 20 hp. The wheelbase was 2438 mm. The vehicle's total weight was 2100 lbs, equivalent to 950 kg. The Model H appeared in 1911, but it had similar specs to the Models G and F. Brakes were, as was common at the time, only on the rear axle. The company was closed in 1912 for unknown reasons.

There is no connection to the Acorn Motor Truck Company, which also produced trucks under the name Acorn in Chicago from 1925 to 1931.
