= Carroll Six =

American automobile

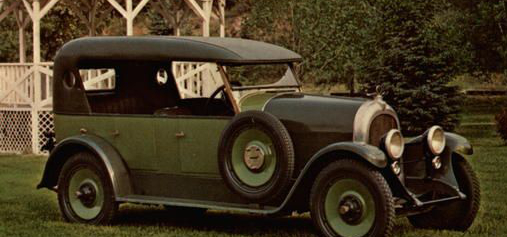
The 1920 Carroll Six Five-Passenger Close-Coupled Touring Car.

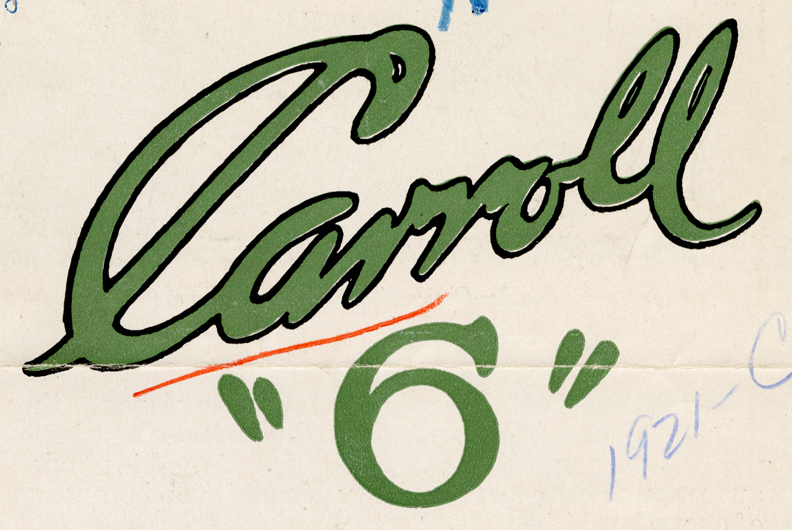
The 1921 logo of Carroll Six.

The Carroll Six, commonly known as Carroll Car, was an automobile built by the Carroll Motorcar Company of Lorain, Ohio, from 1920 to 1922.

== History ==
Charles F. Carroll, the company's founder, was an advertising mogul who had success in an account with Fisk Tires through an agency he operated in nearby Cleveland. He attempted to purchase the Moon Automobile Company of St. Louis, Missouri, following the death of Joseph W. Moon in 1918 but did not succeed. Carroll's earnings from the advertising business financed his car-building venture, and he built automobiles in a factory located in a former brass works on Washington Avenue in Lorain, Ohio.

The Carroll car was first distributed by Lucas and Christensen of Cleveland, according to an October 23, 1920 article in Motor Age magazine.

== Car details ==
The Carroll Six was offered in both a two-door roadster model and as a four-door open touring sedan. The four-door had a distinctive black leather over steel California top, which was a non-folding hardtop with an opera window in the C-pillar. The car was also unusual in that the radiator was placed behind the front axle. Two paint colors were available, Carroll Green and Burgundy Red, each in two-tone finishes.

It sold for US$3985 FOB and offered many items as standard, such as a leather interior, at a time when options were becoming popular among car buyers.

The cars were assembled from parts purchased from various manufacturers. Carroll Cars were fitted with a Buda six-cylinder engine, but there are records showing that Beaver sixes and Rochester sixes may have been used. The 66 hp engine's top speed was 62 mph/100 km/h.

The Carroll Six car was exhibited at the Cleveland Automobile Show in 1921 and advertised as having an aluminum frame.

== Production ==
Actual production figures vary. Approximately 600 cars were built; however, some sources state that the number is about 400 cars, mostly touring sedans. Other sources state 235 or 183 cars. Only one confirmed survivor, a Carroll Green touring sedan, is on display at the William E. Swigart, Jr. Antique Automobile Museum located in Huntingdon, Pennsylvania. This car was purchased directly from Charles F. Carroll in 1967 and had been his personal car for many years.

== End of the line ==
Although accounts vary, it has been said that a number of cars were assembled and placed on a train bound for California to fill dealer orders. The cars were shipped with missing or inadequate radiator fluid and the train was held over during a blizzard in Chicago. When the cars arrived in California, none of them would start or could be driven; all had damaged engine blocks. They were scrapped and were a total loss, costing the company its business. This, along with a national economic downturn, brought the assembly of the Carroll Six to a halt in 1922.

== Gallery ==
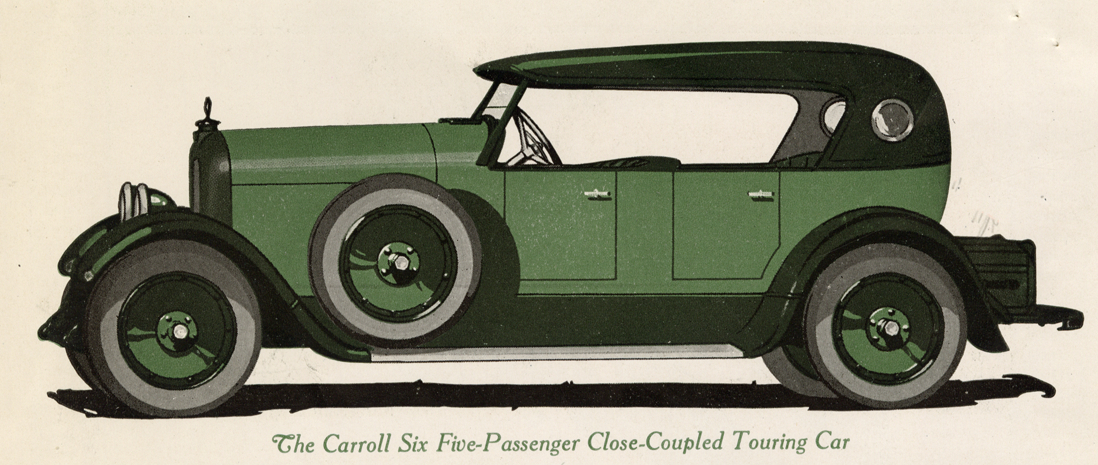
1921 illustration of Carroll Six Five-Passenger Close-Coupled Touring Car

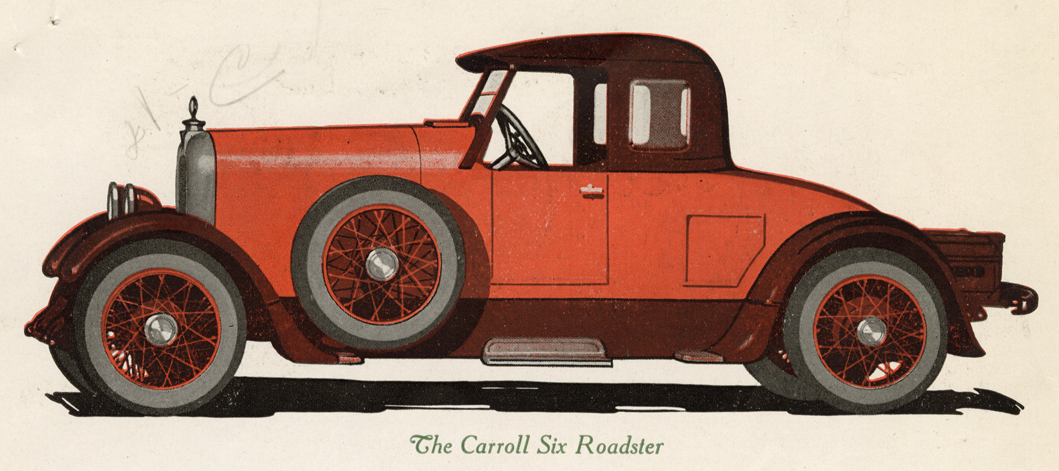
1921 illustration of Carroll Six Roadster

== See also ==
- Moon Automobile Company
- Buda Engine Company
