= Titan Truck Service Company =

Defunct American motor vehicle manufacturer

- Formerly: Titan Truck & Tractor Company
- Type: Truck Company
- Industry: Manufacturing
- Founded: 1917; 109 years ago
- Founder: R.S. Boemer, Joseph C. Millmann, Henry F. Millmann
- Defunct: 1932; 94 years ago
- Headquarters: Milwaukee, US
- Products: Trucks

The Titan Truck Service Company of Milwaukee, was a truck manufacturer.

== History ==
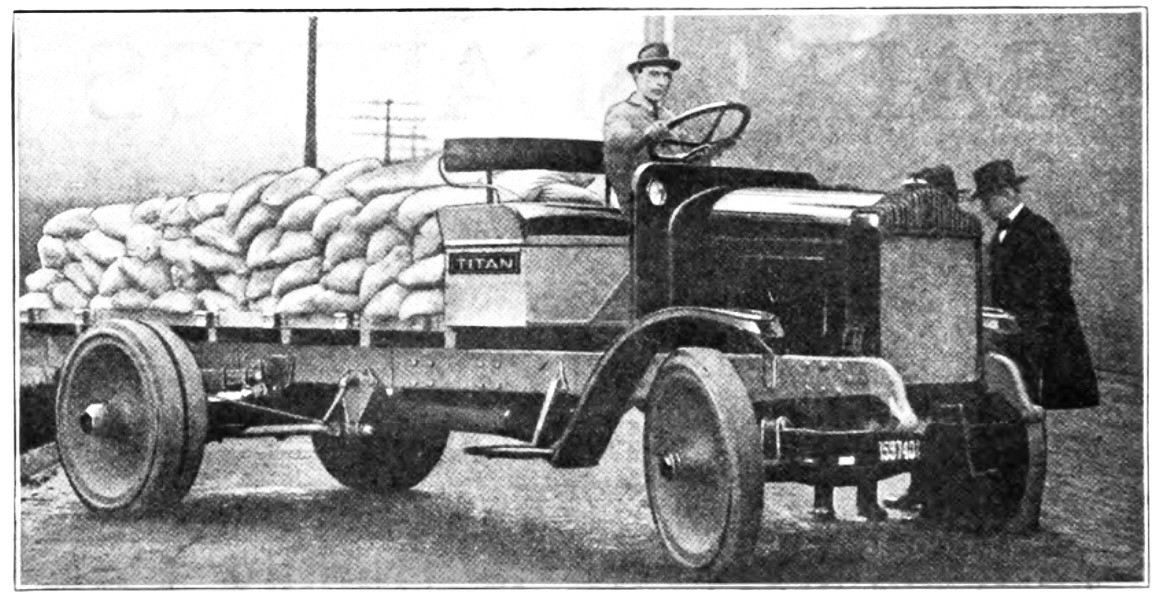
Titan truck (1917)

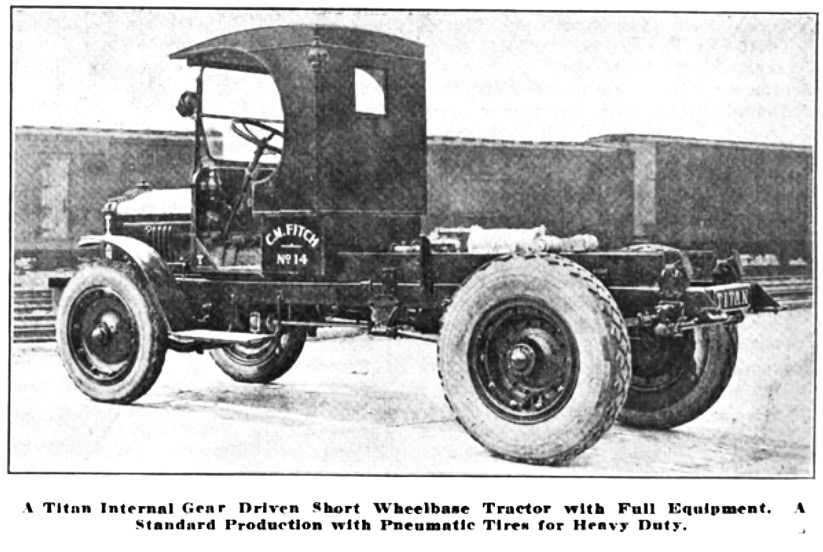
Titan Truck (1920) Pneumatic Tires

The company was founded in 1917 by R.S. Boemer, Joseph C. Millmann, and Henry F. Millmann in Milwaukee with a starting capital of $100,000. The original company name was Titan Truck Company, which was renamed Titan Truck & Tractor Company until the final name became Titan Truck Service Company. The brand name of the trucks, which were already being produced in 1917, was Titan. The engines came from Buda. A surviving 5-ton truck could be seen at the Boyertown Museum of Historic Vehicles in Pennsylvania.
