= Day-Elder =

Defunct American motor vehicle manufacturer

Day-Elder Motors Corporation
- Company type: Truck Manufacturing
- Industry: Automotive
- Founded: 1918
- Defunct: 1937
- Headquarters: Irvington, New Jersey, United States
- Area served: United States, Canada
- Key people: Charles P. Day
- Products: Trucks, automotive parts

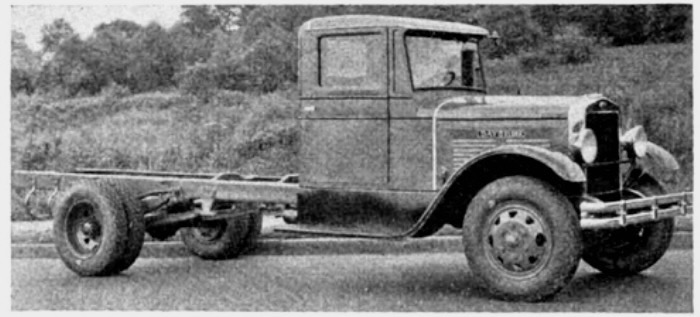
Day-Elder Model 160 (1930-1932)

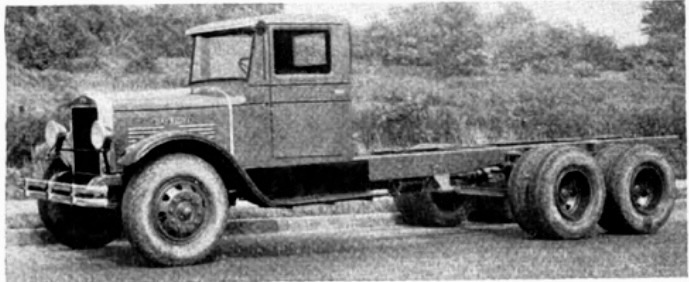
Day-Elder Model 285 (1930-1932)

Day-Elder Motors Corporation (1918-1937, also known as D.E.) was a manufacturer of trucks in Irvington, New Jersey. Production began in 1918. The company originated from the earlier National Motors Manufacturing Company, also of Irvington. The vehicles used proprietary engines, transmissions, and rear axles. The brand used a worm-gear final drive, leading to a smooth drive - this was considered enough of a selling argument that a worm gear was adopted as the brand's logo and heavily used in the brand's advertising. Day-Elder also had a steady market in fire trucks, and chassis were sold to be used as taxicabs in New York City. Some sources state that the brand was applied to trucks at least as early as 1916, although this seems unlikely as the company was only incorporated on December 26, 1916.

== History ==
When introduced, Day-Elder offered four models, of one, two, three, or six tonnes capacity. Their New York debut was at the Armory in February 1919. By 1920 the range was up to six "standardized" models, still within the same weight range. The company's president was a Charles P. Day, who founded the company together with a F. G. Elder and a Theo. McMarsh.

Day-Elder used four-cylinder engines from Buda Engine Co. or Continental. Transmissions came from Muncie or Brown-Lipe, while rear axles were from Timken, Sheldon, or Columbia. Fairly successful for a manufacturer which depended on outside suppliers for major parts, they began to reach nationwide distribution in the twenties and were also sold in Canada. Most of their early expansion was east of the Mississippi river, but as early as 1920 their farm trucks were being advertised on the West Coast. The brand's market then began to shrink and they were once again confined mostly to the local tri-state area.

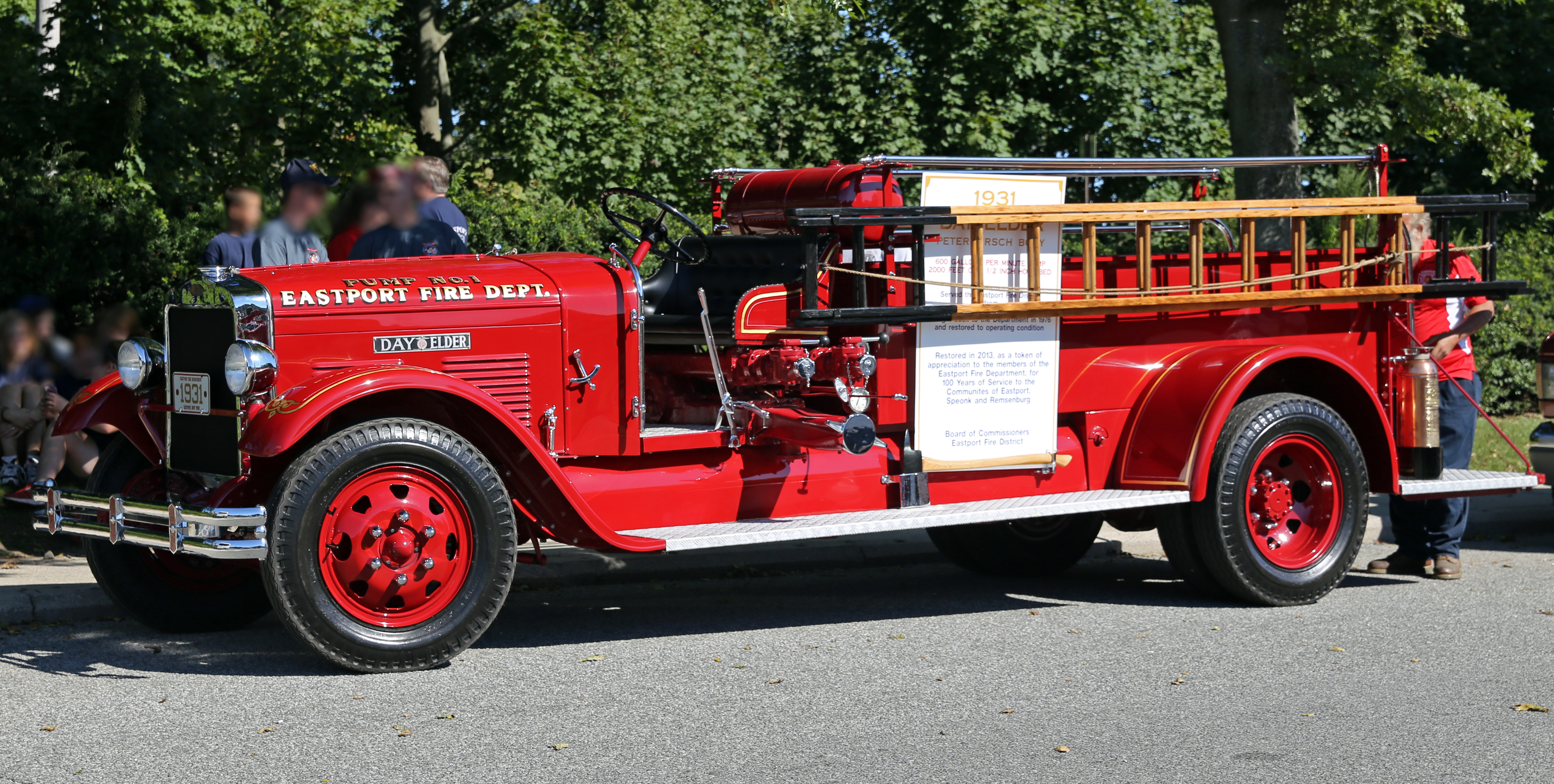
1931 Day-Elder fire engine of Eastport, NY

D.E. introduced a six-cylinder range (dubbed the "Super Service Sixes") in July 1930. This range, comprising eleven models, had fully enclosed "all-weather" cabins and chrome exterior fittings. In order to better compete with other manufacturers who were strong in D.E.'s home area, they then added heavier trucks of up to 8 tonnes in 1930, and engines from Hercules and others were also made available. None of this sufficed however, and Day-Elder ended up shutting its doors in 1937, as they could not weather the Great Depression.
