= Senn von Münsingen =

Swiss knightly family (13th–14th c.)

- Current region: Aare basin, cantons of Bern and Solothurn
- Origin: Münsingen
- Founded: 13th century
- Titles: Knights; lords of Münsingen, Buchegg, Balmegg, and Diessenberg
- Estates: Castles of Münsingen, Balmegg, Buchegg, and Diessenberg
- Dissolution: early 15th century

The Senn von Münsingen were a knightly family of the 13th and 14th centuries who held property and rights, as allods or fiefs, in the Aare basin.

== History ==
The older center of the family's lordship lay between Thun and Bern, near Münsingen, and a later one near the castles of Buchegg and Balmegg, on the border between Bern and Solothurn. In their lordship the Senn held the rights of patronage and tithe. The knight Johannes von Münsingen was the first to bear the surname Senn, from 1241. The family allied with the noble families of the region—the counts of Buchegg, Bechburg, and Neuchâtel, the margraves of Hochberg, and the lords of Hallwyl—and were vassals of the counts of Kyburg and of the prince-bishop of Basel.

Several members held high ecclesiastical offices, such as Johannes, bishop of Basel in 1335; Margareta (1379), abbess of Niedermünster in Alsace; Konrad (1349–1356) and Diebold (1359–1370), provosts of Moutier-Grandval; and Franz, commander of the Teutonic Order at Köniz from 1364 to 1398. The Senn remained ministerials and did not move the center of their activities into the towns.

In the struggle for power over the Aare basin, the family sided with its overlords against Bern and Solothurn, which on several occasions in the 14th century partly destroyed their castles at Münsingen, Balmegg, Buchegg, and Diessenberg. Neither the inheritance of the lordship of Buchegg in 1347 nor the title of baron granted by Emperor Charles IV to Burkhard in 1360 enabled the Senn to maintain their rank. At the end of the 14th century Elisabeth (1410), the last heir of the Senn and of the collateral branch of the Senn von Buchegg, sold the lordship of Münsingen to the burghers of Bern, Diessenberg to the Bokess family of Thun, and Buchegg to the city of Solothurn.

== Bibliography ==
- R. Feller, Geschichte Berns, 1, 1946
- R. C. Schwinges, ed., Berns mutige Zeit, 2003
