= Rehberger & Son =

Defunct American motor vehicle manufacturer

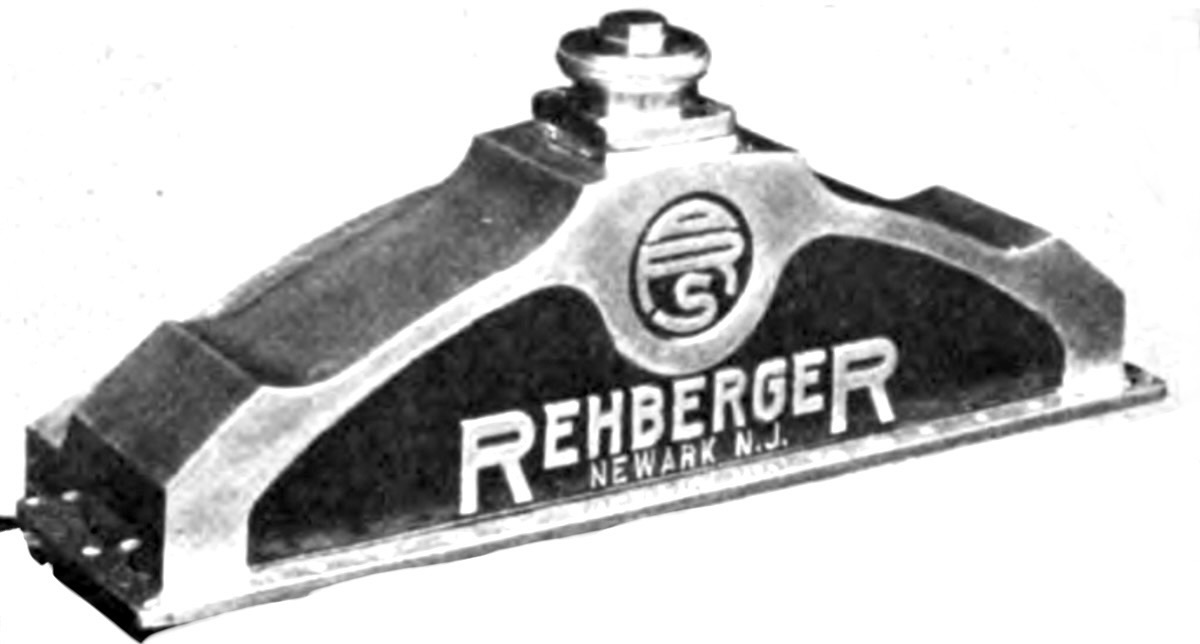
- Type: Truck company
- Industry: Manufacturing
- Founded: 1923; 103 years ago
- Founder: Arthur Rehberger
- Defunct: 1938; 88 years ago
- Headquarters: Newark, New Jersey, US
- Products: Trucks

The Rehberger & Son of Newark, New Jersey, was a truck manufacturer.

== History ==
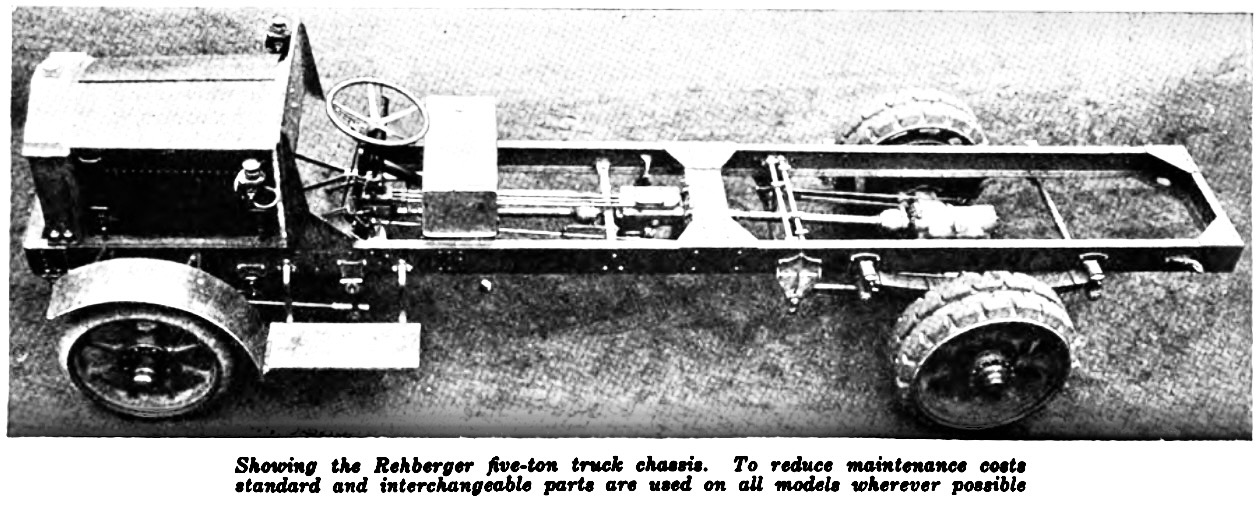
Rehberger Model D (5 to)

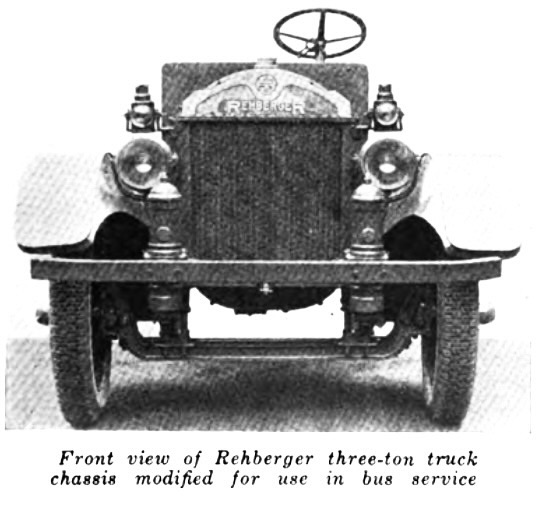
Rehberger Model B (3 to)

The company was founded in 1923. The trademark was the initials of the company name Arthur Rehberger & Son, arranged in a circular shape on the radiator grille. As was common at the time, the trucks were assembled using high-quality parts available on the market. The engines were supplied by the company Buda. Starting in 1933, the focus shifted mainly from truck manufacturing to bus manufacturing. Production ended in 1938. The total production of all trucks and buses in this period from 1923 to 1938 was 323.

== Production models ==
1923

- Model 13

1924

- Model C
- Model D

1925

- Model A (2 to) Buda Motor Model KTU
- Model B (3 to) Buda Motor Model YBU
- Model B-1 (3 to) Buda Motor Model YBU
- ⟨Model B-2⟩ (25 persons on 3 to chassis) Buda Motor Model BUS
- Model C (4 to) Buda Motor Model YBU
- Model D (5 to) Buda Motor Model BTU

1926

- Model A (2 to) Buda Motor Model KTU
- Model B (3 to) Buda Motor Model YBU
- ⟨Model B-2⟩ (25 persons on 3 to chassis) Buda Motor Model BUS
- ⟨Model B-3⟩ (30 persons on 3 to chassis) Buda Motor Model BUS
- Model C (4 to) Buda Motor Model YBU
- Model D (5 to) Buda Motor Model BTU

1927

- Model A (2 to) Buda Motor Model KTU
- Model B (3 to) Buda Motor Model YBU
- ⟨Model B-2⟩ (25 persons on 3 to chassis) Buda Motor Model BUS
- ⟨Model B-3⟩ (30 persons on 3 to chassis) Buda Motor Model BUS
- ⟨Model B-4⟩ (29 persons on 3 to chassis) Buda Motor Model BUS
- Model C (4 to) Buda Motor Model YBU
- Model D (5 to) Buda Motor Model BTU

1928

- Model A (2 to) Buda Motor Model KTU
- Model A6 (2 to)
- Model B (3 to) Buda Motor Model YBU
- ⟨Model B-2⟩ (25 persons on 3 to chassis) Buda Motor Model BUS
- ⟨Model B-3⟩ (30 persons on 3 to chassis) Buda Motor Model BUS
- ⟨Model B-4⟩ (29 persons on 3 to chassis) Buda Motor Model BUS
- Model C (4 to) Buda Motor Model YBU
- Model D (5 to) Buda Motor Model BTU

Model in angle bracket =⟨Bus⟩
