= Armleder =

Armleder is a surname. Notable people with the surname include:

- John Armleder (born 1948), Swiss performance artist, painter, sculptor, and curator
- "King Armleder" Arnold von Uissigheim (c. 1298–1336), persecutor of the Jews
- Otto Armleder was a truck manufacturer
