= Berthold von Buchegg =

Bishop of Strasbourg (died 1353)

- Bishop of Strasbourg
- Church: Catholic Church
- Elected: 1328
- Term ended: 1353
- Previous posts: Teutonic commander; elected Bishop of Speyer (1328)

Personal details
- Died: 24 November 1353 Molsheim, Alsace

Berthold von Buchegg (first mentioned 1297 – 24 November 1353) was a Catholic prelate who served as Bishop of Strasbourg from 1328 until his death.

== Biography ==
Berthold was a son of Heinrich, landgrave of Burgundy, and of Adelheid von Strassberg, and a brother of Hugo von Buchegg and Matthias von Buchegg. First mentioned in 1297 as a knight of the Teutonic Order at Beuggen in Baden, he served as Teutonic commander at Sumiswald (1302–1312), Beuggen (1305–1307), and Koblenz (1324), and as provincial commander (Landkomtur) in Alsace and Burgundy from 1305 to 1321.

In 1328 Berthold was elected Bishop of Speyer and then Bishop of Strasbourg, an office he held from 1328 to 1353. He represented the party of the Habsburgs and the Curia but submitted to Louis the Bavarian in 1338. Although in 1338 he still sought to protect the Jews against the peasant Armleder movement, the indebted bishop himself took part in the pogrom of 1349.

== Bibliography ==
- Neue Deutsche Biographie 2, 158
- F. Graus, Pest – Geissler – Judenmorde, 1987 (3rd ed. 1994), 174–186
- H. Thomas, Ludwig der Bayer, 1993
- Gatz, Die Bischöfe des Heiligen Römischen Reiches, 758
