= Keystone Motor Truck Corporation =

American truck manufacturer, 1919–1924

- Company type: Truck Company
- Industry: Manufacturing
- Founded: 1919; 107 years ago
- Founder: H. B. Harper
- Defunct: 1923; 103 years ago
- Headquarters: Oaks, Pennsylvania, US
- Products: Trucks

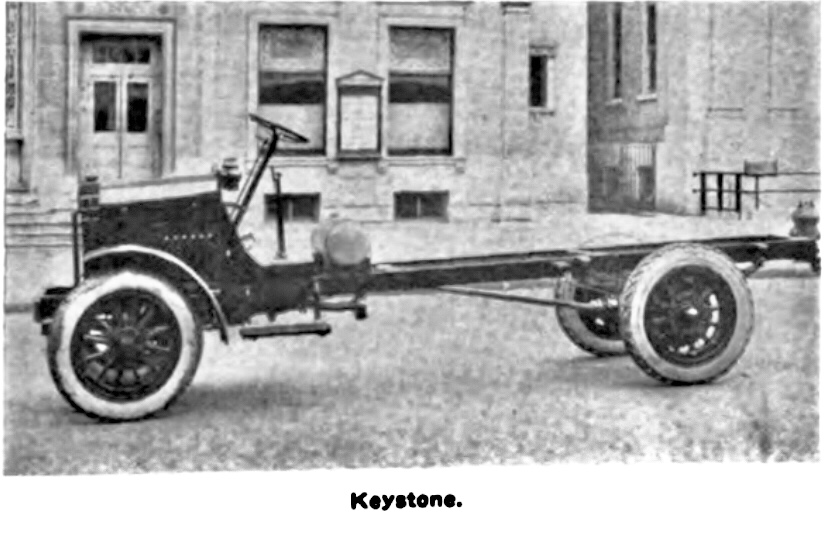
Keystone Model 40

The Keystone Motor Truck Corporation of Oaks, Pennsylvania, was a truck manufacturer.

== History ==
The Keystone Motor Truck Corporation was founded in 1919 in Philadelphia to manufacture trucks. The first name designation from the work in Philadelphia was Commercial Car Unit Co. The Keystone Motor Truck Corporation was able to acquire the assets of the Commercial Car Unit Co. The factory building in Oaks, Pennsylvania, was ready for occupancy on April 1, 1920. With railroad connections to both the Pennsylvania Railroad and the Philadelphia & Reading Railway, a good supply was ensured. However, the headquarters remained in Philadelphia. The production program consisted of two Keystone models with one and two ton capacities. The first vehicles, still designed by Hilton W. Sofield, Vice President and General Manager of the company, were supposed to be powered by an in-house Keystone four-cylinder four-stroke vertical engine. The displacement was 3707 cc with a bore of 101.6 mm and a stroke of 114.3 mm. The engine was cooled by thermosiphon water cooling. The top speed was 16.2 miles per hour = 26 km/h. The wheelbase measured 144 inches = 3658 mm. The pneumatic tires were to be 34 x 3½ inches or 35 x 5 inches at the front and 36 x 6 inches at the rear. A driveshaft powered the rear axle. The selling price was 1795 dollars. The top positions of the company are filled by: President, H. B. Harper of Overland-Harper Co. Vice President in charge of sales, M. S. Cooper, formerly head of the commercial vehicle department at Willys-Overland Works. Treasurer, C. W. Binns, formerly Secretary and Treasurer of the Commercial Car Unit Co. Directors: J. Kearsley Mitchell, H. B. Harper, M. S. Cooper, P. I. Harper, and A. E. Nash. The chief engineer was M. Olbeter. The series engines then came from Buda. The Model 40 had a four-cylinder engine with 3710 cc, a bore of 95.25 mm, and a stroke of 130.175 mm. The Model 20 had a four-cylinder engine with 2346 cc, a bore of 85.725 mm, and a stroke of 101.6 mm.

There is no known connection to the Keystone Motor Company of Philadelphia which produced cars in 1900.

=== Production figures Keystone trucks ===
The pre-assigned serial numbers only indicate the maximum possible production quantity.

Year	Production figures	Model	Load capacity	Serial number
1919	75	40	2 tons	1001 to 1075
1920	↑	20	1 ton	2000 to 2300
	↑	40	2 tons	2000 to 2300
1921	↑	40	2 tons	2000 to 2300
1922	300	40	2 tons	2000 to 2300
1923	300	40	2 tons	3000 to 3300
Sum	675			
