= Stewart Motor Corporation =

Defunct American motor vehicle manufacturer

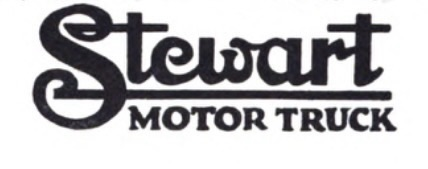
- Formerly: Allentown, Pennsylvania
- Type: Truck Company
- Industry: Manufacturing
- Founded: 1912; 114 years ago
- Founder: Raymond G. Stewart and Thomas R. Lippard, Charles J. Bork, Bernhard L. Fisher, and William F. Strasmer
- Defunct: 1939; 87 years ago
- Headquarters: Buffalo, New York, US
- Products: Trucks , Cars

The Stewart Motor Corporation of Buffalo, New York, was a truck and car manufacturer.

== History ==
The Stewart Motor Coporation was founded in 1912 in Buffalo, New York by Raymond G. Stewart and Thomas R. Lippard. In 1940, the company relocated its headquarters to Indianapolis, Indiana. The company worked with more than 400 US distributors and its products were sold in more than 56 counties.

The company initially produced commercial vehicles, but released passenger vehicles between 1915 and 1916. Production of vehicles ceased in 1939.
