= Hugo von Buchegg =

Swiss mercenary leader (died 1347)

- Died: 1347
- Occupations: Mercenary leader, military commander
- Spouses: Margarita Galarda; Margarethe von Neuenburg (m. 1337)
- Relatives: Matthias von Buchegg (brother); Berthold von Buchegg (brother)

Hugo von Buchegg (first mentioned 1273 – 1347) was a Swiss nobleman and military commander, regarded as the first significant mercenary leader (Reisläufer) of Solothurn.

== Biography ==
Count Hugo was a son of Heinrich, landgrave of Burgundy, and of Adelheid von Strassberg, and a brother of Matthias von Buchegg and Berthold von Buchegg. He married first Margarita Galarda and second, in 1337, Margarethe von Neuenburg, daughter of Rodolphe IV de Neuchâtel. He became a burgher of Bern in 1335.

In the service of King Albert I, Hugo fought in the Rhineland against the Rhenish prince-electors in 1301, and in 1306 took part in the conquest of Bohemia after the death of King Wenceslaus III. In 1310 he joined the Italian expedition of King Henry of Luxembourg. In 1313 he received the office of Schultheiss of Solothurn from Emperor Henry at Pisa as a pledge, and in 1315, owing to financial difficulties, he pledged to the city of Bern the toll there that he had received as an imperial pledge in 1310.

Around 1316 Hugo went to Naples, where as a troop commander of King Robert he took part in the conquest of Genoa and the expedition to Avignon. He spent a considerable time at the court of Pope John XXII, who exercised decisive influence on the election of Hugo's brothers Matthias as Archbishop of Mainz (1321) and Berthold as Bishop of Strasbourg (1330). In 1344–1345 he ceded the right to elect the Schultheiss of Solothurn to the city.

== Bibliography ==
- Urkundenbuch der Stadt und Landschaft Solothurn, 1, genealogical table 3
- H. Sigrist, "Die Grafen von Buchegg", in Jurablätter 35, 1973, 57–73
