= American Motor Truck Company =

Defunct American motor vehicle manufacturer

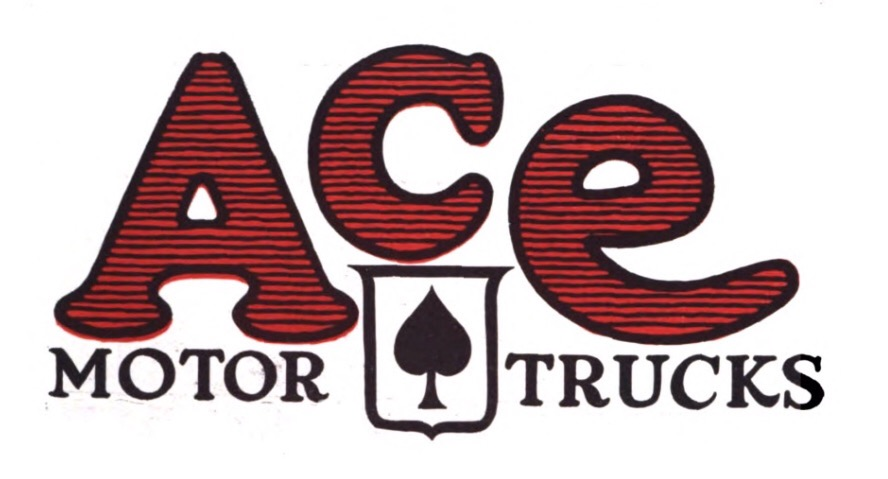
- Formerly: Blair Motor Truck Company
- Type: Truck Company
- Industry: Manufacturing
- Founded: 1918; 108 years ago
- Founder: Frank M. Blair
- Defunct: 1927; 99 years ago
- Headquarters: Newark, Ohio, US
- Products: Trucks

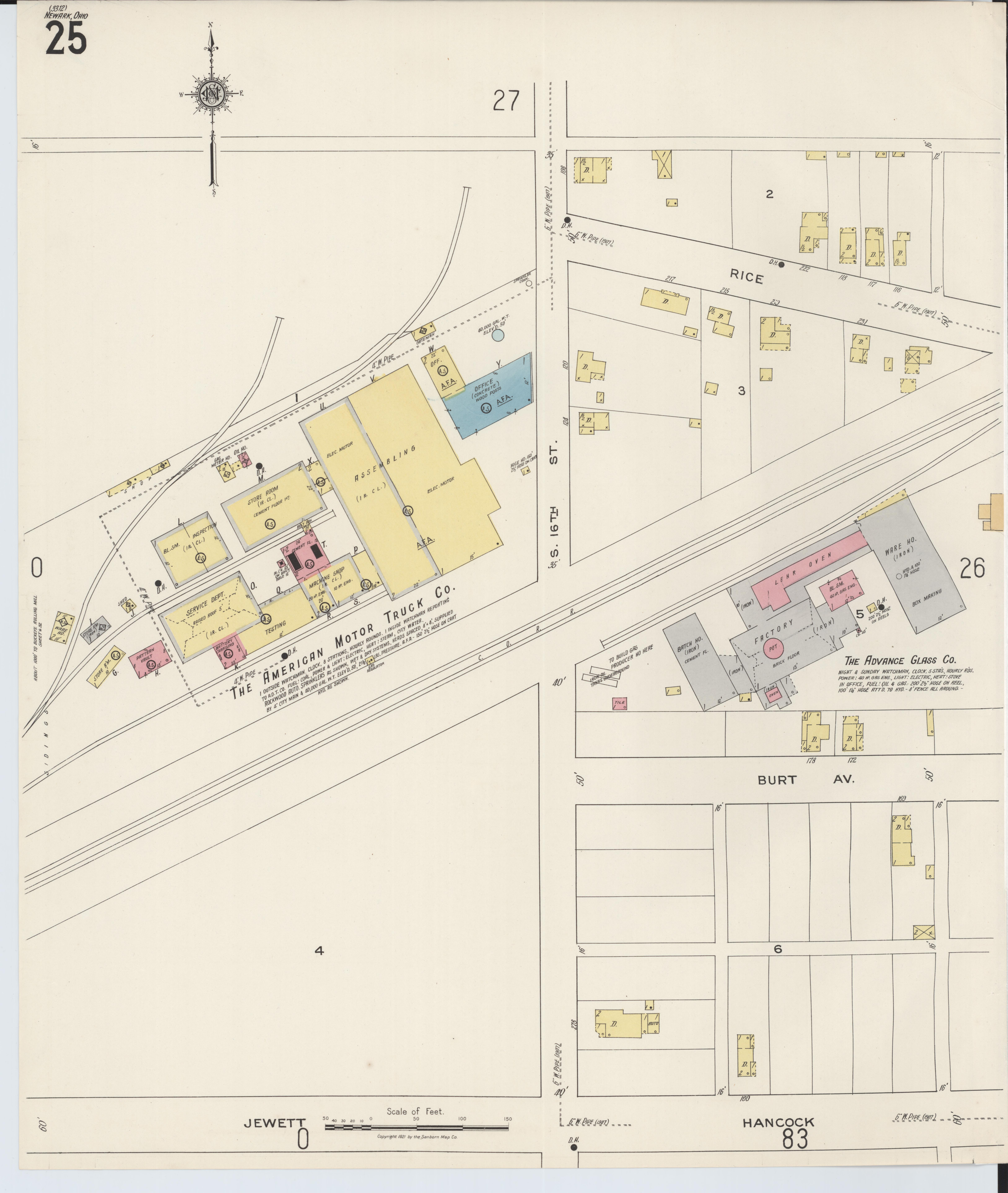
American Motor Truck Company plant (1920)

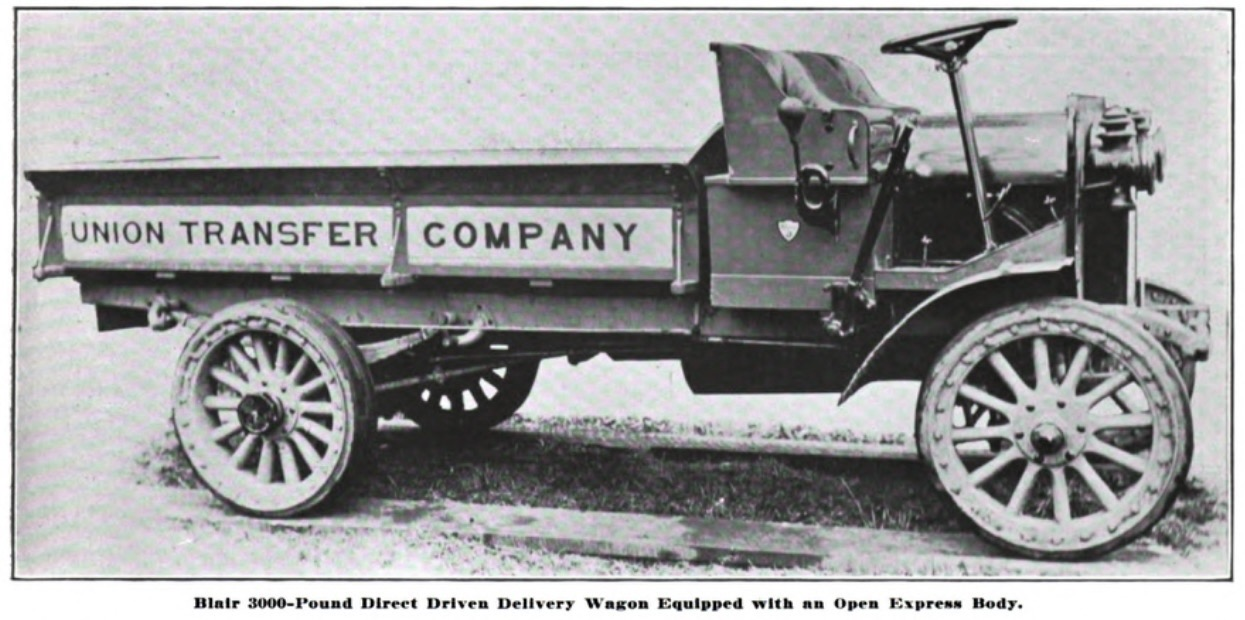
Blair Truck 1,5 to (1913)

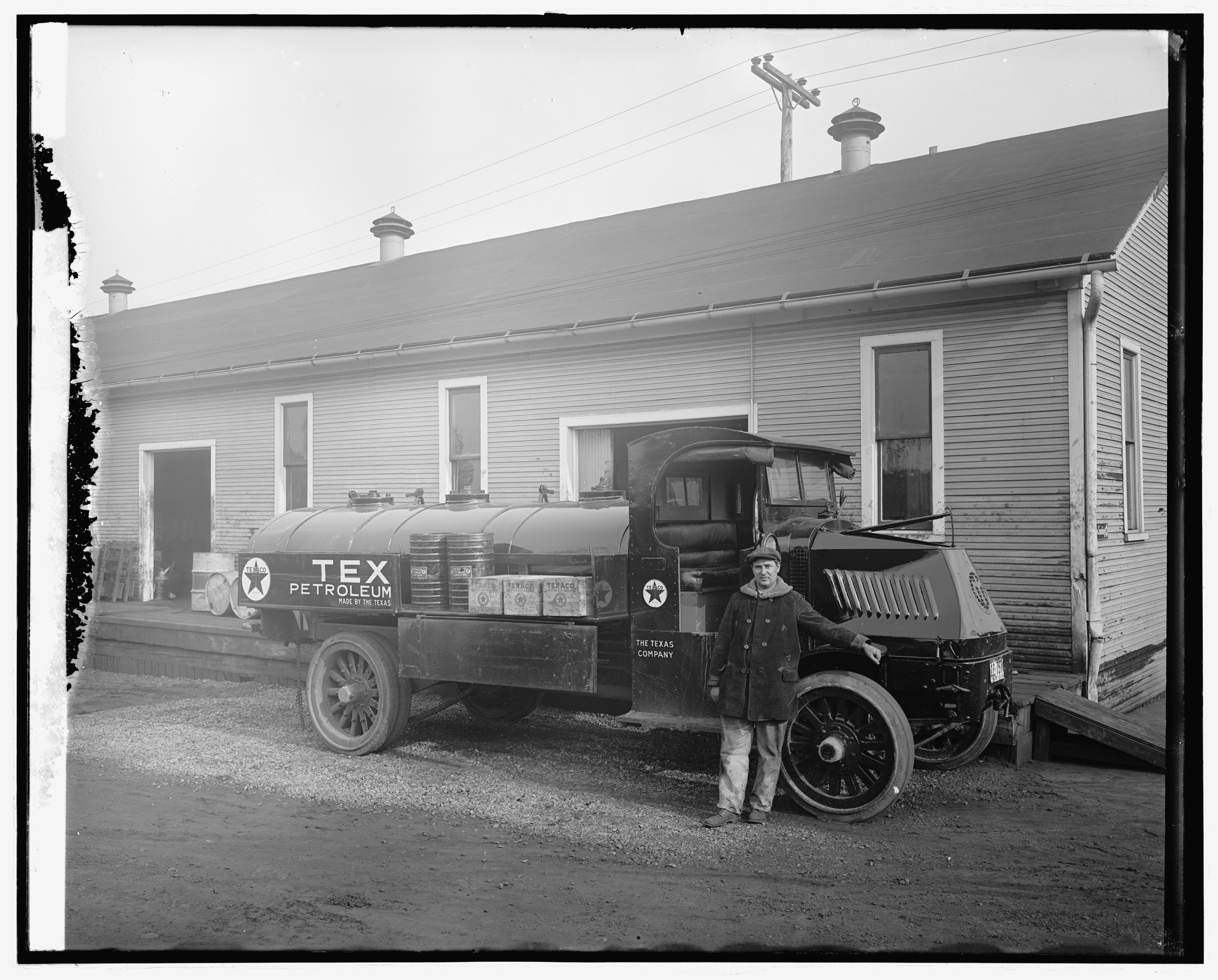
ACE truck

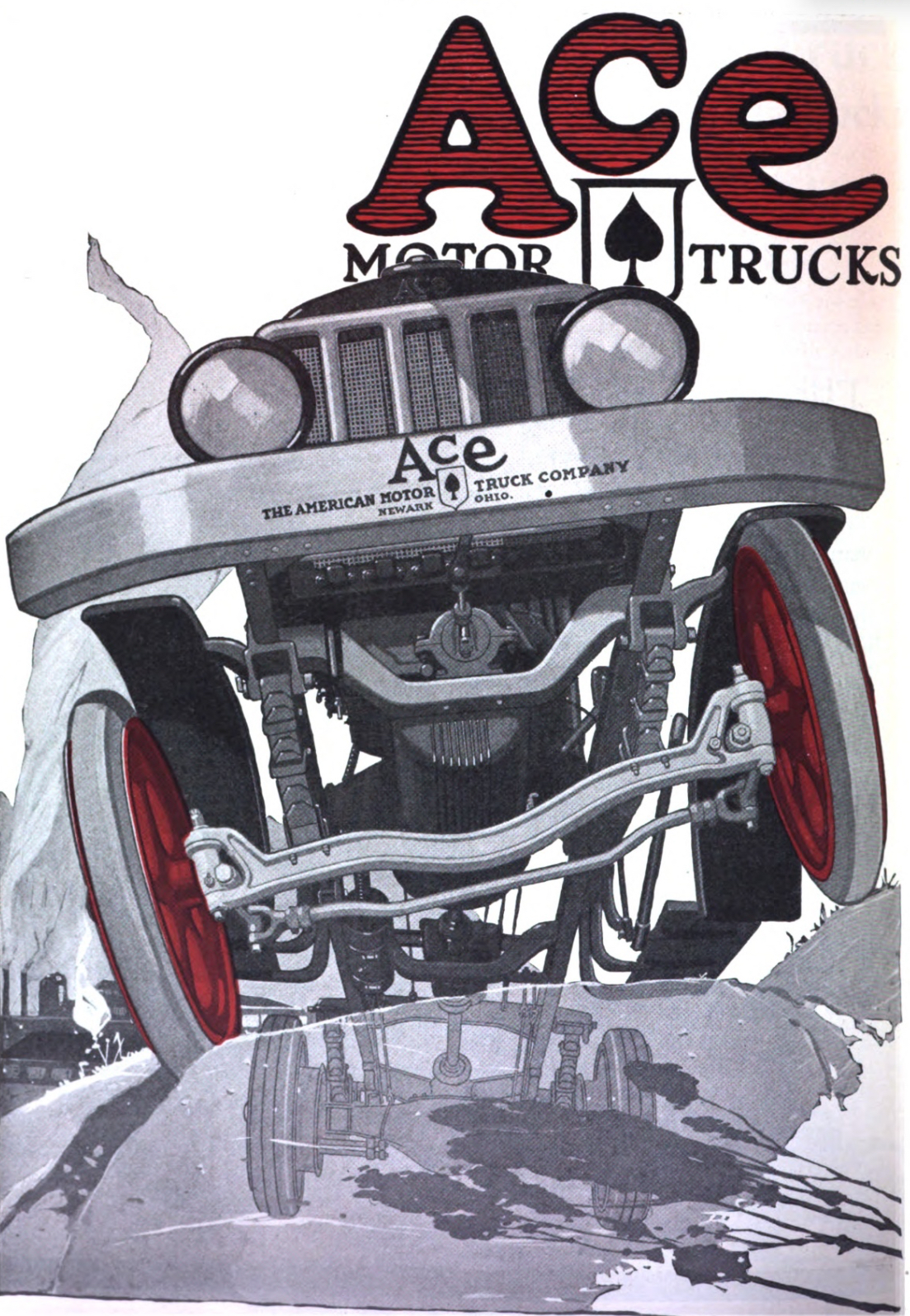
ACE Advertisement (1920)

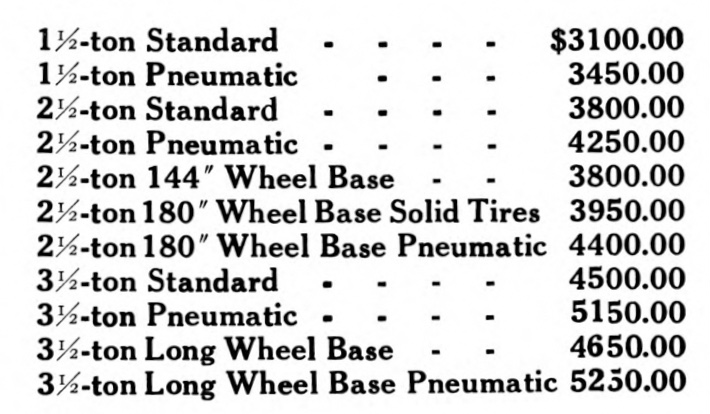
ACE Price List (1920)

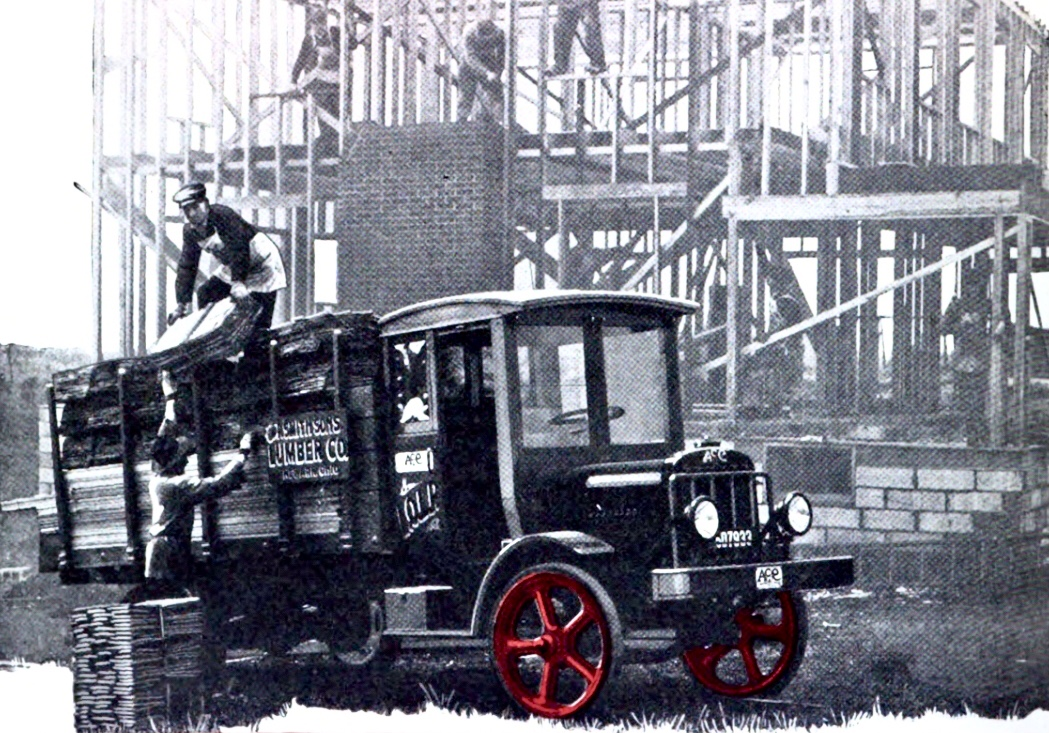
ACE Truck (1920)

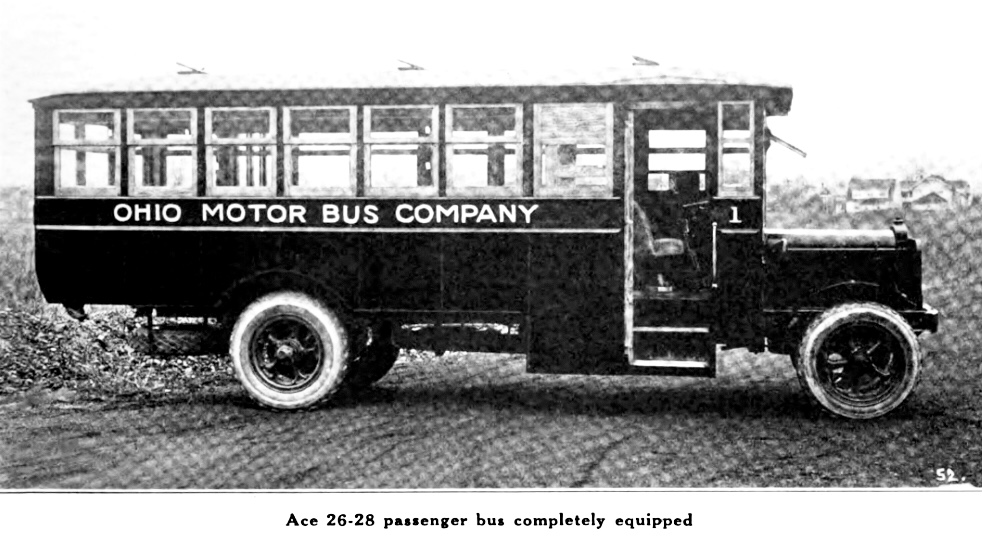
ACE bus 26-28 persons (1922)

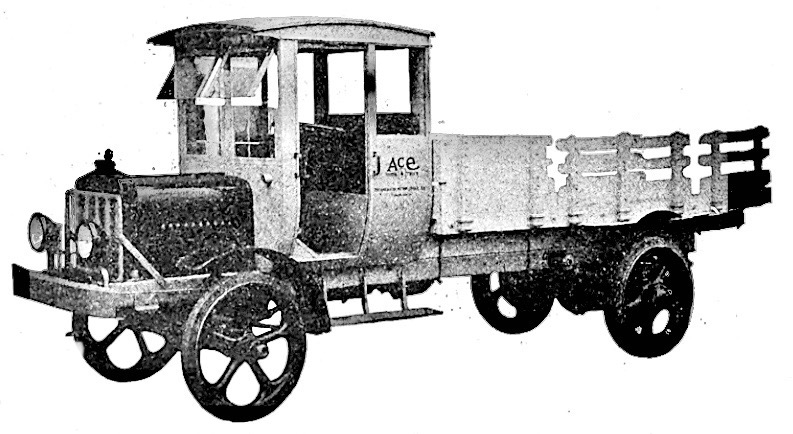
ACE Truck (1919)

The American Motor Truck Company of Newark, Ohio, was a truck manufacturer.

== History ==
The American Motor Truck Company produced trucks from 1918 to 1927. The predecessor company was founded at the end of 1911 as Blair Manufacturing Company with a capital of US$ 100,000 by Frank M. Blair. To finance the starting capital, the investors John R. McCune, Willis A. Robbins, Edwin C. Wright, and Harry H. Baird came on board. The company was operated under the name Blair Manufacturing Company until 1914. Then it was renamed in Blair Motor Truck Company (1914–1918). Another renaming took place in 1918, leading to the American Motor Truck Company (1918–1927). The brand names were Blair from 1911 to 1918 and ACE from 1918.

== Products ==
In 1920

- 1 t
- 2 t Buda engine 5114 cc
- 3 t Buda engine 5114 cc
- 4 t

=== Production figures ACE trucks ===
The pre-assigned serial numbers only indicate the maximum possible production quantity.

Year	Production figures	Model	Load capacity	Serial number
1918				
1919		56	1 t	
			1.5 t	
			2.5 t	
1920			1t, 2t, 3 t, 4 t	
1921				
1922		C	1.5 t	
		A	2.5 t	
	> 9	C bus	26-28 persons	
1923		30	1.5 t	3000 to
		40	2 t	4000 to
		40 long wheel base	2 t	4000 to
		60	3 t	5000 to
		60 long wheel base	3 t	5000 to
		D bus	25 persons	
		C bus	29 persons	
1924		30	1.5 t	
		56	2.5 t	
		60	3 t	
		60 long wheel base	3 t	
		C bus	30 persons	
		C bus 6 cyl.	30 persons	
1925		30	1.5 t	
		56	2.5 t	
		60	3 t	
		60 long wheel base	3 t	
		C bus	30 persons	
		C bus 6 cyl.	30 persons	
1926		60	2.5 t	
		C bus 6 cyl.	30 persons	
		C bus 6 cyl.	30 persons	
1927		60	2.5 t	
		C bus 6 cyl.	30 persons	
		C bus 6 cyl.	30 persons	
Sum				
