= William E. Swigart Jr. Antique Automobile Museum =

Non-profit museum dedicated to the preservation of American automobile history

- Established: 1957
- Location: Huntingdon, Pennsylvania
- Coordinates: 40.44426°N 77.94615°W
- Website: www.swigartmuseum.com

The William E. Swigart Jr. Antique Automobile Museum, located in Huntingdon, Pennsylvania, is a 501(c)(3) non-profit museum dedicated to the preservation of American automobile history. The collections began as a private passion of founder W. Emmert Swigart in about 1920. The current museum opened in 1957 (69 years ago).

The museum's collection contain about 150 cars, of which 30 to 35 are on display at the museum at one time. One-of-a-kind automobiles include a 1936 Duesenberg 12 cylinder Gentlemen's Speedster, a 1920 Carroll, and a 1916 Scripps-Booth. The Swigart Museum is the only automobile museum in the country where visitors can see two Tuckers side-by-side, the 1947 "Tin Goose" Prototype and #1013. Along with automobiles, the museum's other collections including automotive artwork, bicycles, antique toys, vintage clothing, spittoons, license plates, radiator caps, automobile lights and horns, automobilia and other related items.

The museum is open daily from Memorial Day weekend through the end of October, and hosts many car-related events.

The museum is a member of the National Association of Automobile Museums and the American Association of Museums.

== History ==
About twenty-five years after the first patent was issued for a gasoline powered automobile in 1895, Huntingdon businessman W. Emmert Swigart began to assemble his collection of automobiles. Mr. Swigart recognized that the industry was rapidly developing and that many early manufacturers had already disappeared, so he concentrated on salvaging automobiles before they were scrapped for junk or had given up many of their parts to save some other mechanized contraption. He displayed his collection in the offices and on the lawn of the insurance business of which he was a founding partner, and by the 1930s, both Swigart's business and his automobile collection had outgrown the available office space. In 1935 Mr. Swigart purchased a large, colonial home on Penn Street in Huntingdon and renovated it to accommodate both the insurance business and the collection. In addition to a modern business facility, the refurbished building included woodwork and mantels salvaged from 18th century buildings in Philadelphia intended to serve as a backdrop for the automobile name plates, license plates, and other antiques on display.

In addition to automobiles, Mr. Swigart amassed what is thought to be the largest automobile nameplate and license plate collections in the world. Often his insurance agents out in the field would scour junk yards looking for abandoned cars and return to the office with buckets of name plates, radiator ornaments, and license plates, all then cleaned and mounted by the office staff. By the time of his death in 1949, W. Emmert Swigart had preserved twelve early automobiles plus thousands of automobile related items and literature. William E. Swigart Jr. (1915-2000), the third of his five children and the only one who shared his father's passion for antique automobiles, then stepped into a greater role in the insurance business and took over the care of and display of the collection. He brought most of the collection together under one roof in a former carriage house located at the rear of the Swigart Associates building, naming it the Swigart Memorial Motor Museum. The collection rapidly outgrew the building, and, in August 1957, Mr. Swigart opened the newly constructed Swigart Museum on Route 22, three miles east of Huntingdon. William continued to expand the museum's holdings until his death in 2000, increasing the size of the collection to approximately 200 cars while simultaneously gaining notoriety as one of the top automobile collectors in the United States.

In 2007, sixty of the cars collected by William and his wife, Helen, were sold at auction by their heirs to satisfy Helen's portion of the estate.

== Museum activities ==
- Adopt-A-Car
- Blue Stars Program
- The William E Swigart Jr. Annual Meet
- Collector Car Appreciation Day
- Concours d'Elegance at the Philadelphia Auto Show
