= Matthias von Buchegg =

Archbishop of Mainz (died 1328)

- Archbishop of Mainz
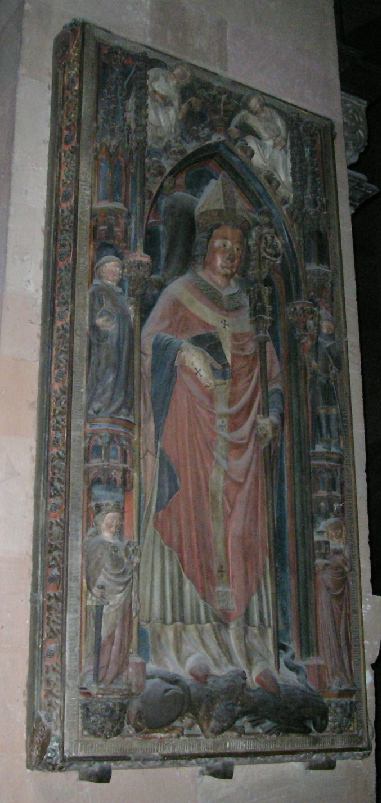
- Archbishop Matthias von Buchegg. Tomb monument in Mainz Cathedral
- Church: Catholic Church
- Elected: 1321
- Term ended: 1328
- Previous post: Provost of Lucerne

Orders
- Consecration: 1323

Personal details
- Died: 9/10 September 1328 Miltenberg, Bavaria
- Buried: Mainz Cathedral

Matthias von Buchegg (first mentioned 1303 – 9/10 September 1328) was a Catholic prelate who served as Archbishop of Mainz and imperial chancellor from 1321 until his death.

== Biography ==
Matthias was the youngest son of Heinrich, landgrave of Burgundy, and of Adelheid von Strassberg, and a brother of Berthold von Buchegg and Hugo von Buchegg. First mentioned at Murbach in Alsace in 1303, he contended unsuccessfully for the office of abbot there as custos from 1303 to 1305. He is attested as provost of Lucerne from 1312 to 1322, although he resided there only intermittently.

In 1321 Matthias was installed in the Archbishopric of Mainz by Pope John XXII as the Habsburg candidate. Consecrated in 1323 as prince-elector and imperial chancellor, he supported the Curia and the Habsburg king Frederick the Fair against Louis the Bavarian, both financially and through a public-peace alliance in 1322, but recognized Louis in 1323.

== Bibliography ==
- Helvetia Sacra III/1, 848 f.
- Neue Deutsche Biographie 16, 405 f.
- H. Thomas, Ludwig der Bayer, 1993
