= Acorn Motor Truck Company =

Defunct American motor vehicle manufacturer

- Type: Truck Company
- Industry: Manufacturing
- Founded: 1925; 101 years ago
- Defunct: 1931; 95 years ago
- Headquarters: Chicago, US
- Products: Trucks

The Acorn Motor Truck Company of Chicago, was a truck manufacturer.

== History ==
The company was officially founded in 1925 in Chicago, Illinois. But production had already started in 1924 with the models 50 and 70. The brand name was Acorn. In 1928, the manufacturing site was moved from Chicago to Cadillac, Michigan. The production lineup was very extensive and ranged from 1 tonners to 5 tonners. The lighter vehicles used engines from Continental, while the heavier vehicles got Buda engines. Production ended in 1931. A connection with the company Acorn from Cincinnati, Ohio, which had already produced light vans from 1910 to 1912, is not known.

The first vehicle of the 1924 Model 50 series used the Buda engine from the ETU series. The wheelbase was 3,962 mm.

== Production models ==
The pre-assigned serial numbers only indicate the maximum possible production quantity.

Year	Production figures	Model	Load capacity	Serial number
1924	4	50	2,5 to	5010 to 5013
		70	3,5 to	7010 to
1925		50	2,5 to	5014 to
		70	3,5 to	
1926		20	1 to	
		30	1,5 to	↓↓
		40	2 to	
		50	2,5 to	
		70	4 to	
		80	4 to	
1927		20	1 to	
	7	30	1,5 to	3007 to 3013
		40	2 to	
		50	2,5 to	
		70	4 to	
		80	4 to	
		15-6	1 to	
1928	8	20-P	1 to	2000 to 2007
		30	1,5 to	↓
	4	30-P	1,5 to	3010 to 3013
	Cadillac plant			
1928		40	2 to	↓
	10	40-P	2 to	4000 to 4009
		45	2,5 to	↓
	11	45-P	2,5 to	4500 to 4510
		50	3 to	↓
	3	50-P	3 to	5031 to 5033
	7	70	4 to	7000 to 7006
	2	100	5 to	10000 to 10001
1929		20-P	1 to	2008 to
		30	1,5 to	↓
		30-P	1,5 to	3014 to
		40	2 to	↓
		40-P	2 to	4010 to
		45	2,5 to	↓
		45-P	2,5 to	4511 to
		50	3 to	↓
		50-P	3 to	5034 to
		70	4 to	7007 to
		100	5 to	10002 to
1930			to	
1931			to	
