= Air-O-Flex Motor Corporation =

Defunct American motor vehicle manufacturer

- Type: Truck Company
- Industry: Manufacturing
- Founded: 1917; 109 years ago
- Founder: A.B. Hanson
- Defunct: 1920; 106 years ago
- Headquarters: Detroit, US
- Products: Trucks

The Air-O-Flex Motor Corporation of Detroit, was a truck manufacturer.

== History ==
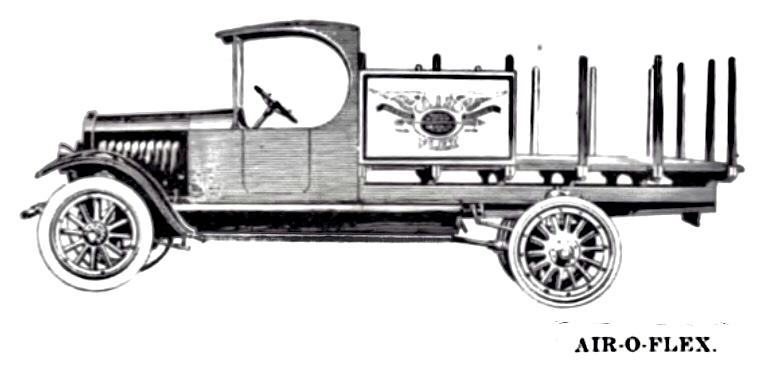
Air-O-Flex 1,5 t

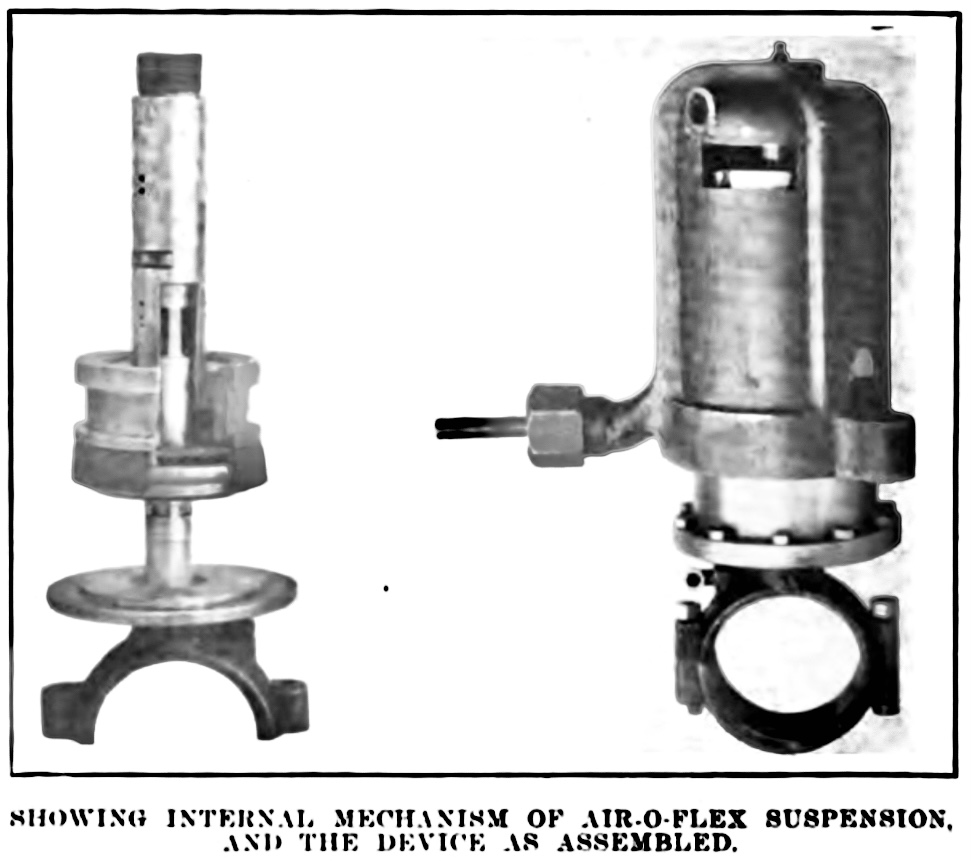
Air-O-Flex Suspension

The company, founded in 1917 in Detroit, Michigan, manufactured light trucks under the brand name Air-O-Flex. A 1.5-ton truck was produced from 1917 to at least 1920. The four-cylinder engine came from Continental and had a displacement of 3801 cc with a bore of 95.25 mm and a stroke of 133.35 mm. The recommended selling price was around 1700 dollars. The factory building was planned to be 300,000 square feet in its final stage. Initially, however, only 100,000 square feet were to be completed. The founding capital was 2,500,000 dollars. Vehicle production was assumed to be 10 vehicles per day. The innovation in the trucks was a pneumatic shock absorber, which demonstrated its performance on a trip from the Atlantic to the Pacific loaded with eggs. The company name was also derived from this damper.
