= O. Armleder & Company =

Defunct American motor vehicle manufacturer

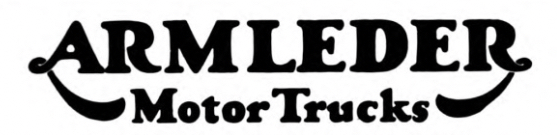
- Type: Truck Company
- Industry: Manufacturing
- Founded: 1910; 116 years ago
- Founder: Otto Armleder (1862–1935)
- Defunct: 1928; 98 years ago
- Headquarters: Cincinnati, US
- Products: Trucks

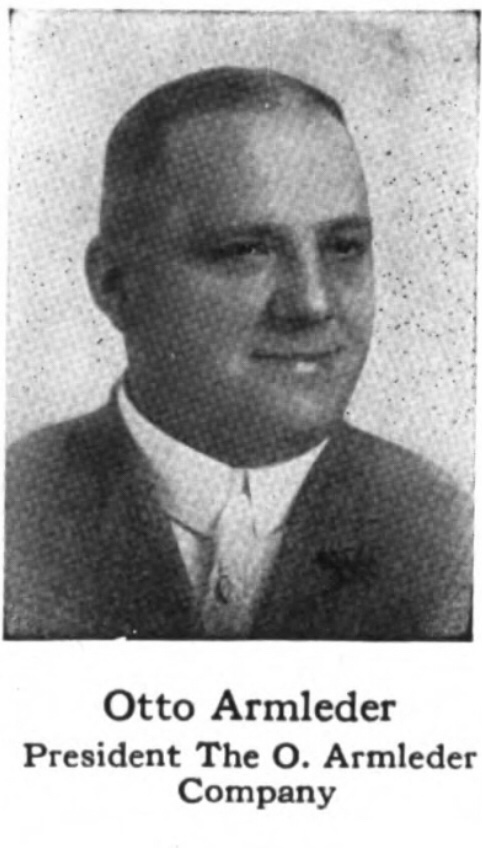
Otto Armleder

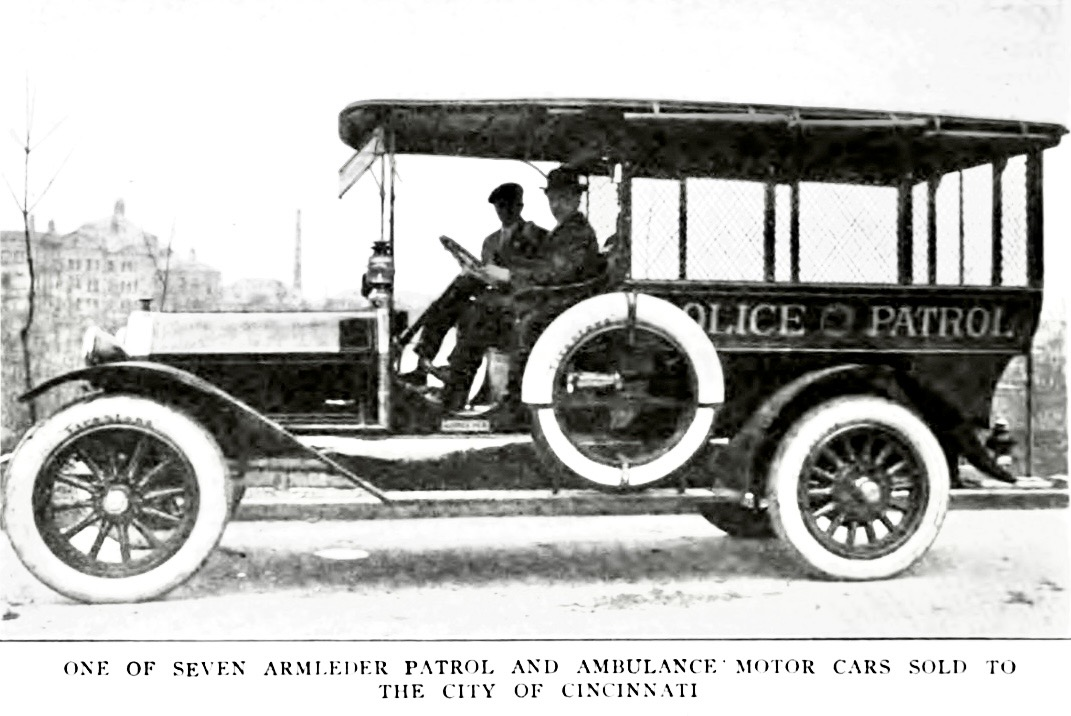
Armleder (1913)

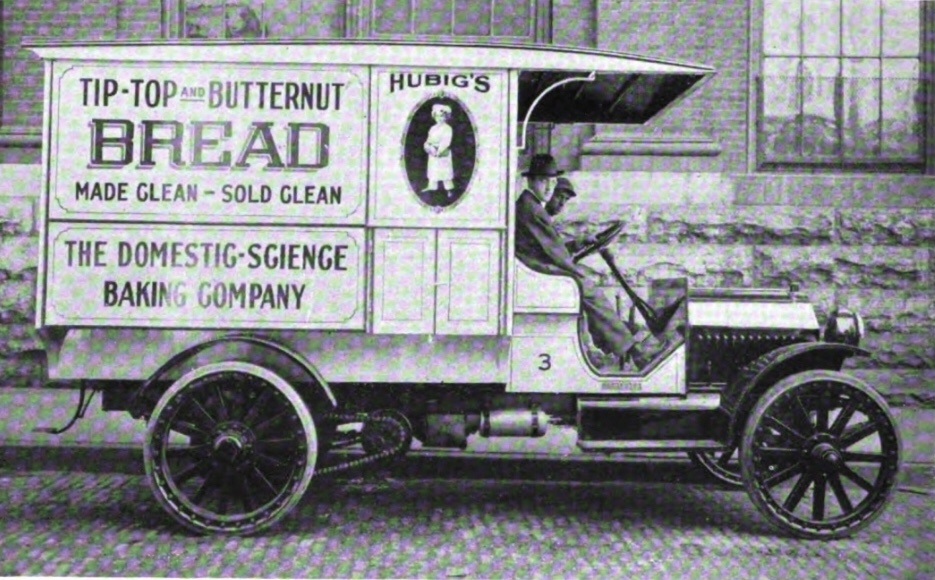
Armleder Model E (1914)

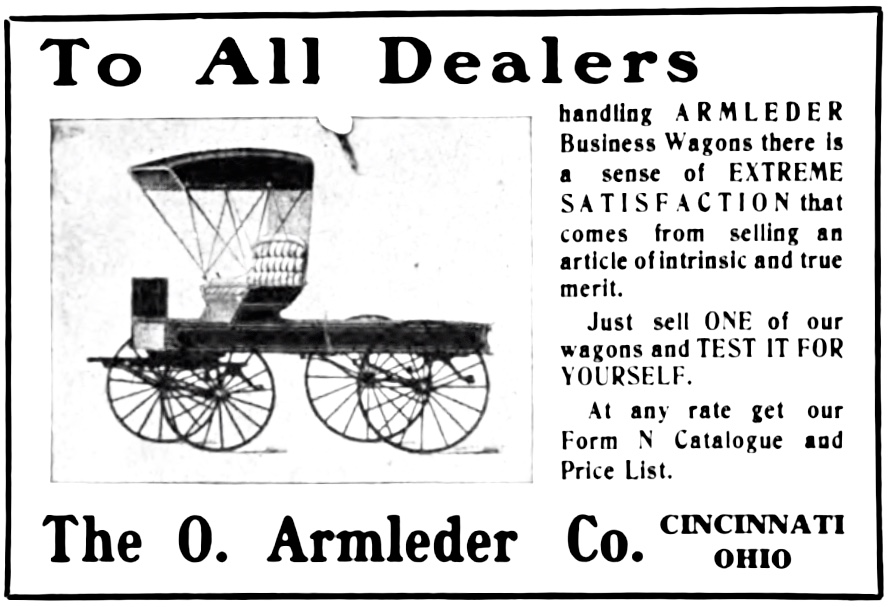
Armleder advertisement (1907)

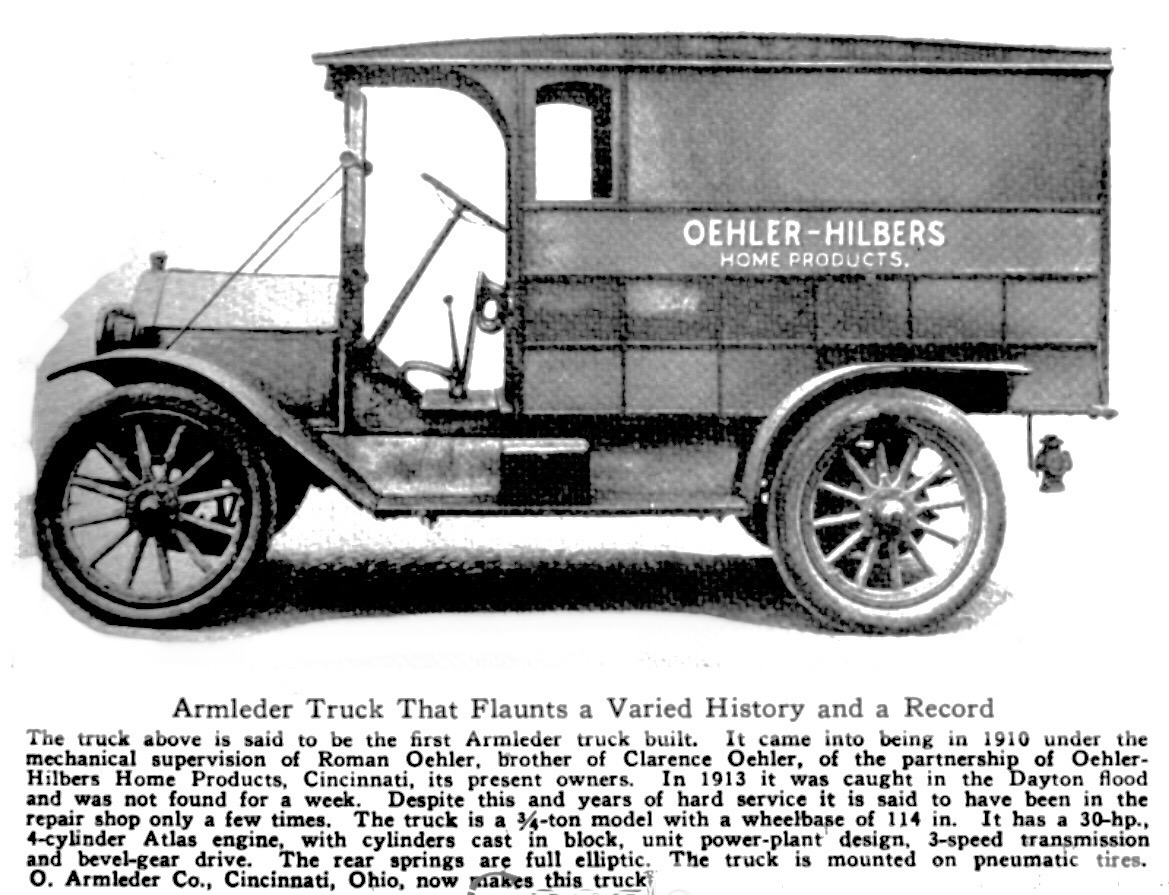
Armleder 0.75 t (1910) First Armleder Truck ever built

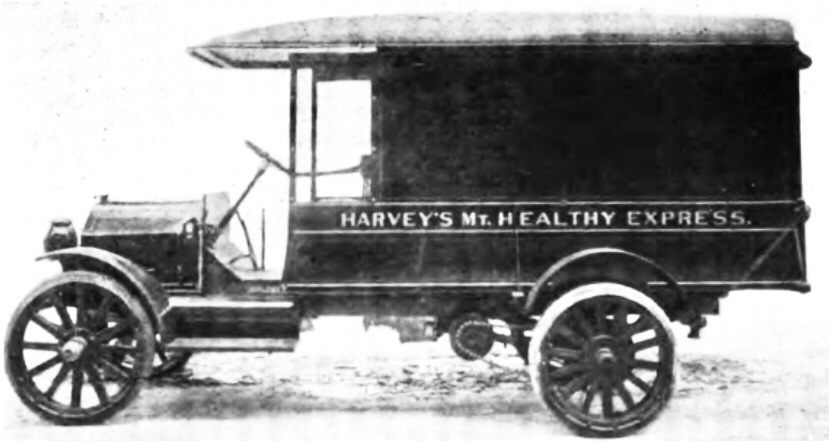
Armleder Model B (1914) 1 t (could also be a Model E Chain driven)

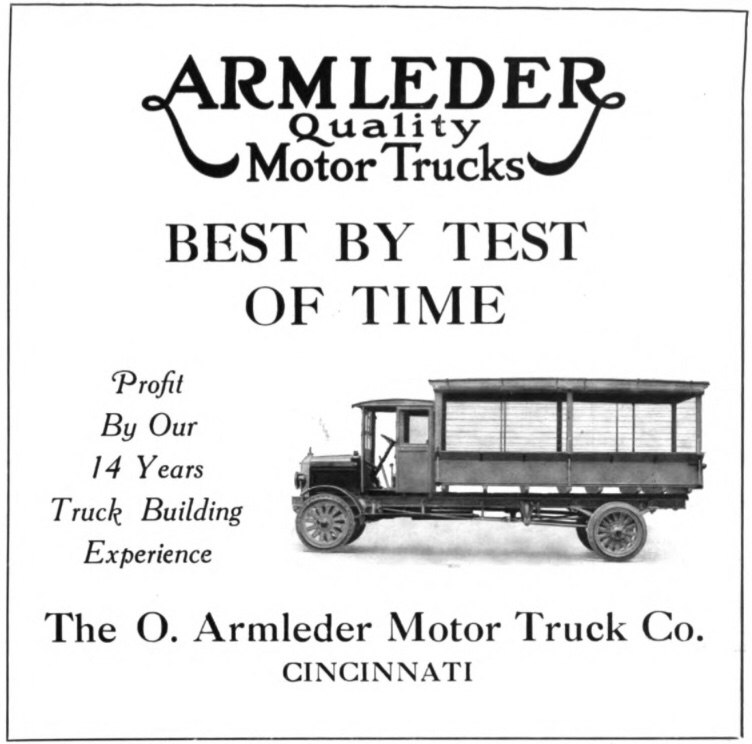
Armleder advertisement (1924)

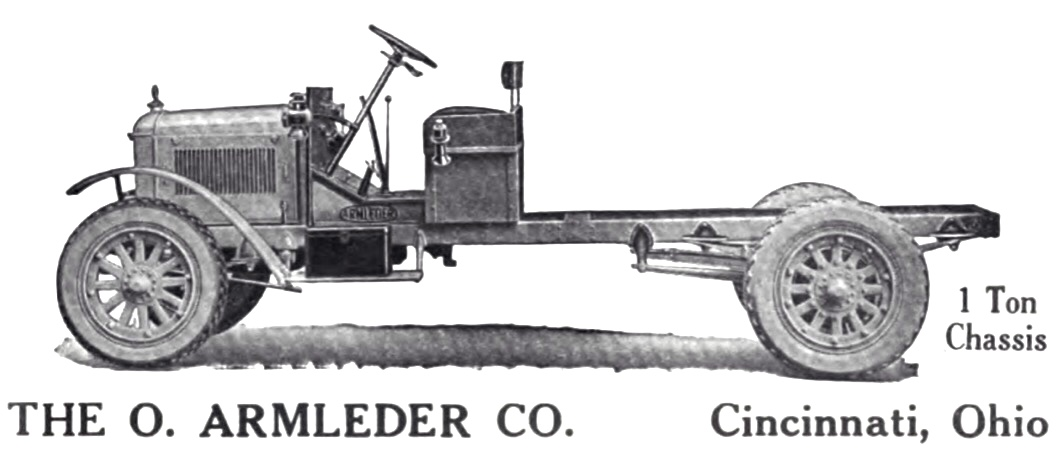
Armleder Model 20 (1921) 1t Chassis

The O. Armleder & Company of Cincinnati, was a truck manufacturer.

== History ==
The O. Armleder & Company produced trucks from 1910 to 1927. In 1904, the factory for the manufacture of carriages, especially for breweries, was located in a complex of over 11,600 m² (125,000 sq. ft.) at 12th Street and Plum Street in Over-the-Rhine, a neighborhood in Cincinnati. Around 1910, production of motorized vehicles gradually began, and carriage manufacturing was increasingly reduced. The company was taken over in 1927 by the LeBlond-Schacht Truck Company, which was also based in Cincinnati. The company continued to operate under the name Armleder Motor Truck Company until 1928. Technically, it was aligned with Schacht trucks, using engines from Wisconsin. In 1936, the Armleder name was discontinued in favor of Schacht.

== Products ==
=== Production figures Armleder trucks ===
The pre-assigned serial numbers only indicate the maximum possible production quantity.

Year	Production figures	Model	Load capacity	Serial number
1910			0.75 t	
1911				
1912				
1913				
1914		B	1 t	
		H	2 t	
		E	2.5 t	
1915	111	HW	2.5 t	239 to 349
	21	HK	3.5 t	2 to 22
1916	268	HW	2.5 t	350 to 617
	42	HK (KW)	3.5 t	23 to 64
Sum	310			
1917	107	HW	2.5 t	618 to 725
	982	HK	3.5 t	66 to 1048
		HC	2 t	
		EC	2.5 t	
1918	277	HW	2.5 t	726 to 1002
	343	HK	3.5 t	1050 to 1392
Sum	620			
1919	1398	HW	2.5 t	1003 to 2400
	382	HK (KW)	3.5 t	1419 to 1800
Sum	1,780			
1920	702	HW	2.5 t	2500 to 3202
	243	HK (KW)	3.5 t	4000 to 4242
	105	20	1 t	6000 to 6104
Sum	1,050			
1921	119	HW	2.5 t	3003 to 3121
	38	HK	3.5 t	4243 to 4280
	35	20	1 t	6105 to 6139
1922		HW	2.5 t	3122 to
		HK	3.5 t	4281 to
		20	1 t	6140
		21	1.5 t	7000
		30	2 t	7500 to
		40	2 t	7500 to
1923		HWB	2.5 t	3400 to
		HWC	2.5 t	3400 to
		HWB	3.5 t	4400 to
		HWC	3.5 t	4400 to
		21	1.5 t	7200 to
		30	1.5 t	7600 to
		40 C	1.5 t	7550 to
		40 B	1.5 t	7550 to
1924				
1925				
1926				
1927		30	1.5 t	
		30 B	1.5 t	
1928		30	1.5 t	
		30 B	1.5 t	
		30-6	1.5 t	
Sum				
