= Logging truck =

Vehicle used for carrying logs

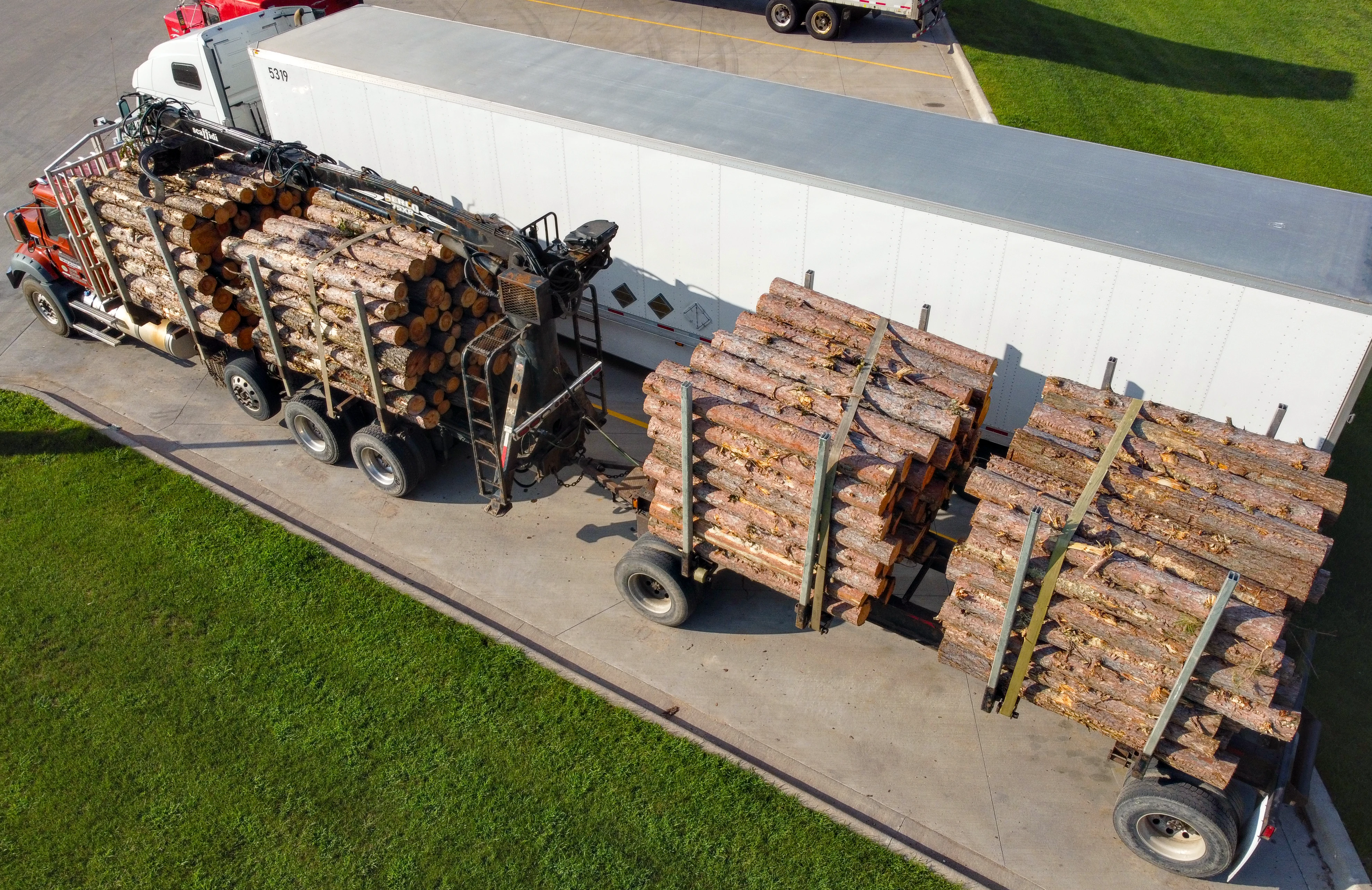
Logging truck with a boom loader

A logging truck or timber lorry is a large truck used to carry logs. Some have integrated flatbeds, some are discrete tractor units, and some are configured to spread a load between the tractor unit and a dollied trailer pulled behind it. More than one trailer is often attached.

== History ==
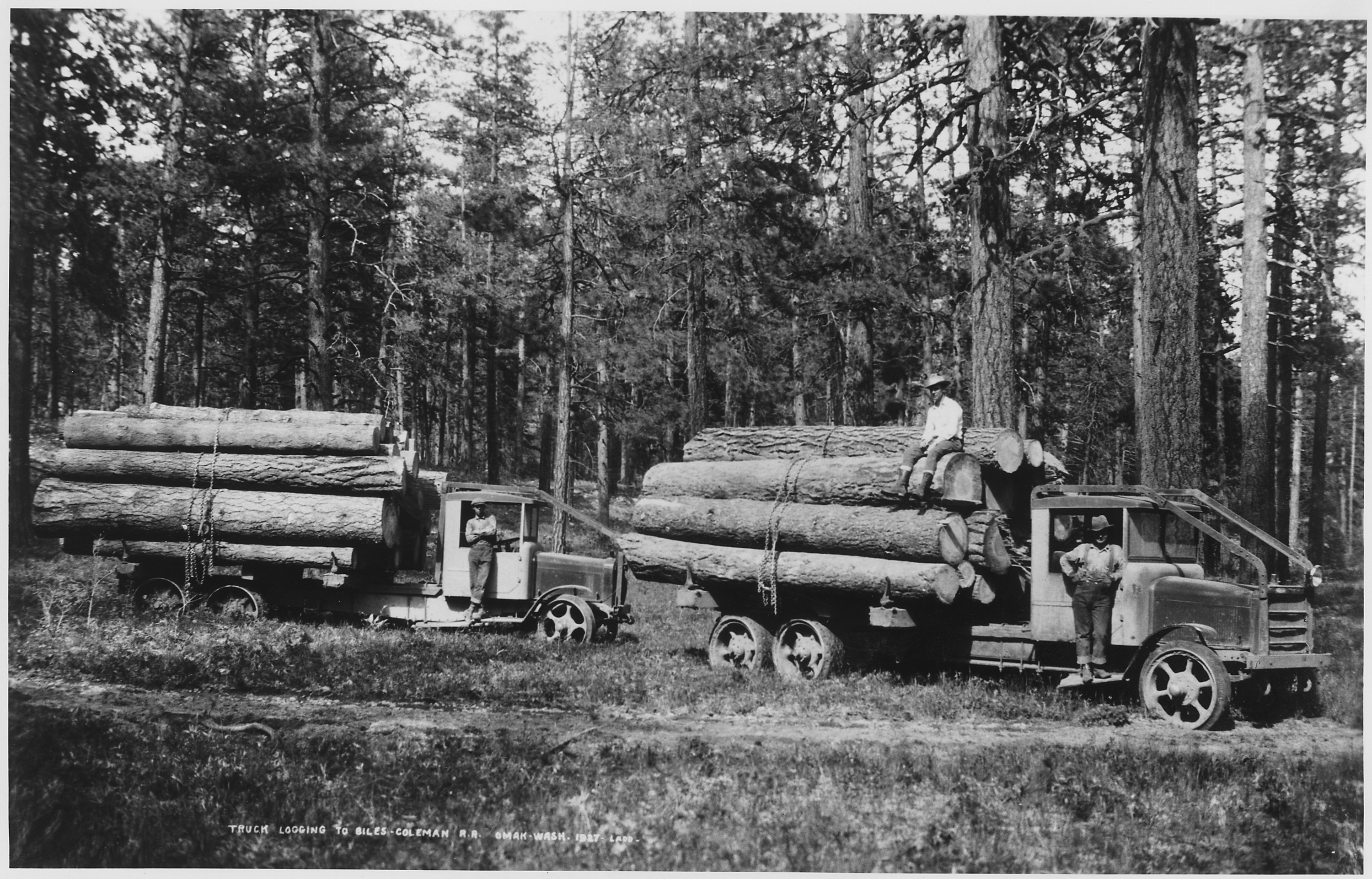
Moreland trucks with solid tires on Moses Mountain in the 1920s

The most convenient trees to cut down were those near waterways for easy transportation. As the supply dwindled and loggers had to go further from water, they used teams of oxen or horses for hauling. These were superseded by steam-powered donkeys and locomotives. The final development was the logging truck.

A truck was used for logging in Covington, Washington, in 1913. The coming of World War I and the resulting demand for the Pacific Northwest's Sitka spruce for airplanes "established log trucking in Washington". The United States Army assigned thousands of men to the Spruce Production Division to build roads into western Washington to harvest the dispersed stands of the best trees. After the war ended, a plenitude of surplus military trucks made their adoption attractive to logging companies, particularly smaller outfits that could not afford expensive locomotives.

The primitive trucks were improved in the 1920s and 1930s, with more powerful engines and better braking systems. The old "narrow, solid rubber—sometimes steel—treadless tires" were replaced by wider pneumatic ones with treads. Plank roads gave way to graded dirt ones. By the mid-1930s, trucks were hauling as much timber out of the Pacific Northwest as the railroads.

World War II saw improved truck designs, and once again these were passed along to logging companies through the sale of surplus military vehicles after the war was over.

== Configuration ==
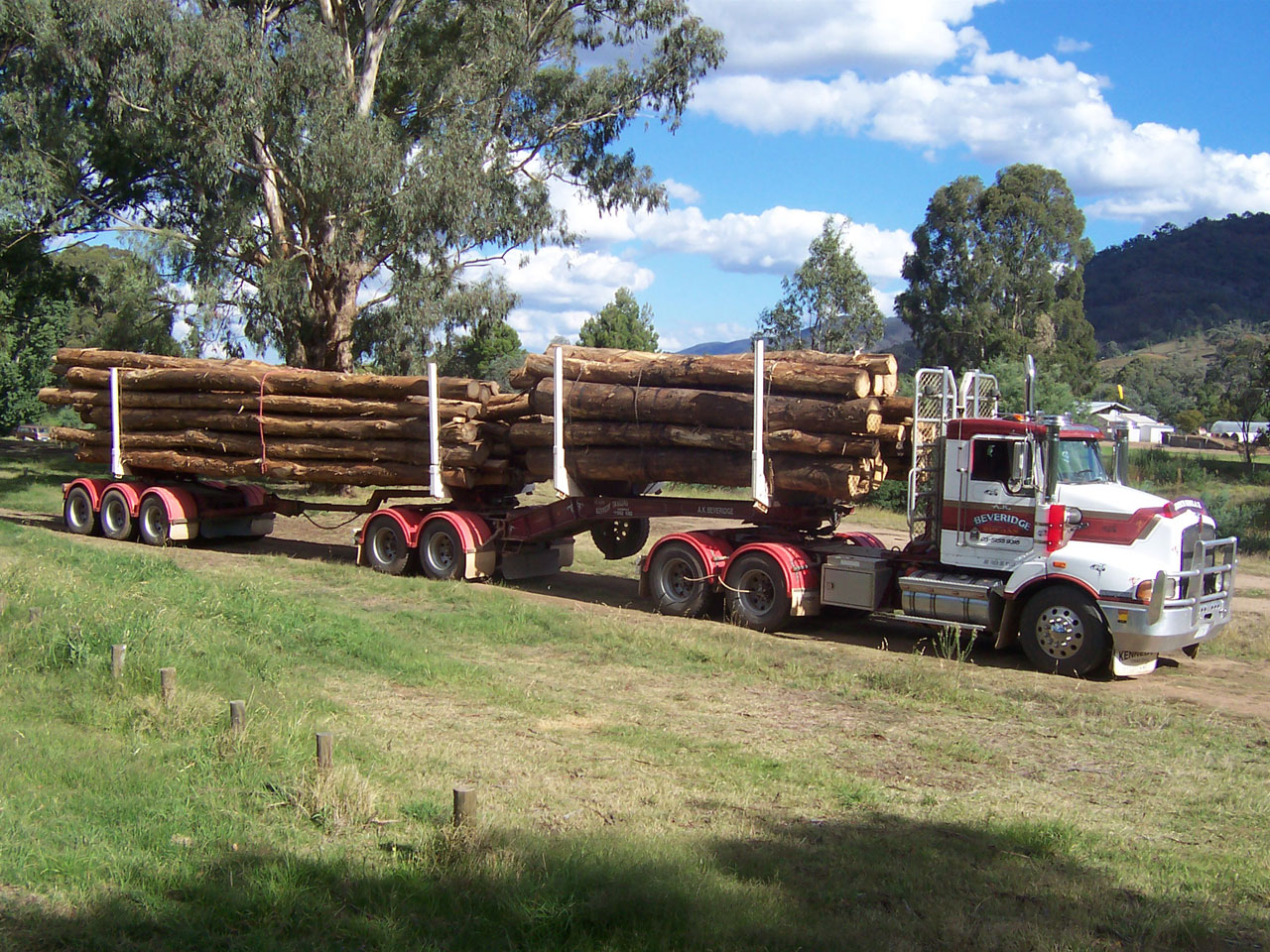
B double logging truck in Australia

There are two main types of modern logging trucks—those used on rough ground and trails in the forest where they are felled and those used for transport on normal highways and roads. Since the roads in forests are rough and often temporary, the suspension and tires of an offroad truck are especially significant. Solid, low pressure and high pressure tires have been used. As many as nine axles may be used to provide low ground pressure and good traction.

Timber is commonly grown in hilly country unsuitable for farming and so the ability of a log truck to climb a gradient is significant. The steepness depends on the quality of the surface. Mud and snow are harder to climb than gravel and soil. For a manageable gradient, the speed will then depend upon the power of the truck. The legal weight limits will vary by jurisdiction. For example, in the southern states of the US, they range from 80,000 to 88,000 pounds (36,300 to 39,900 kg)—about 40 short tons (35.7 long tons; 36.3 t).

To load the logs, the truck may be fitted with one or more winches or cranes. The logs are commonly unloaded by letting them roll off sideways.

== Gallery ==
Different logging trucks

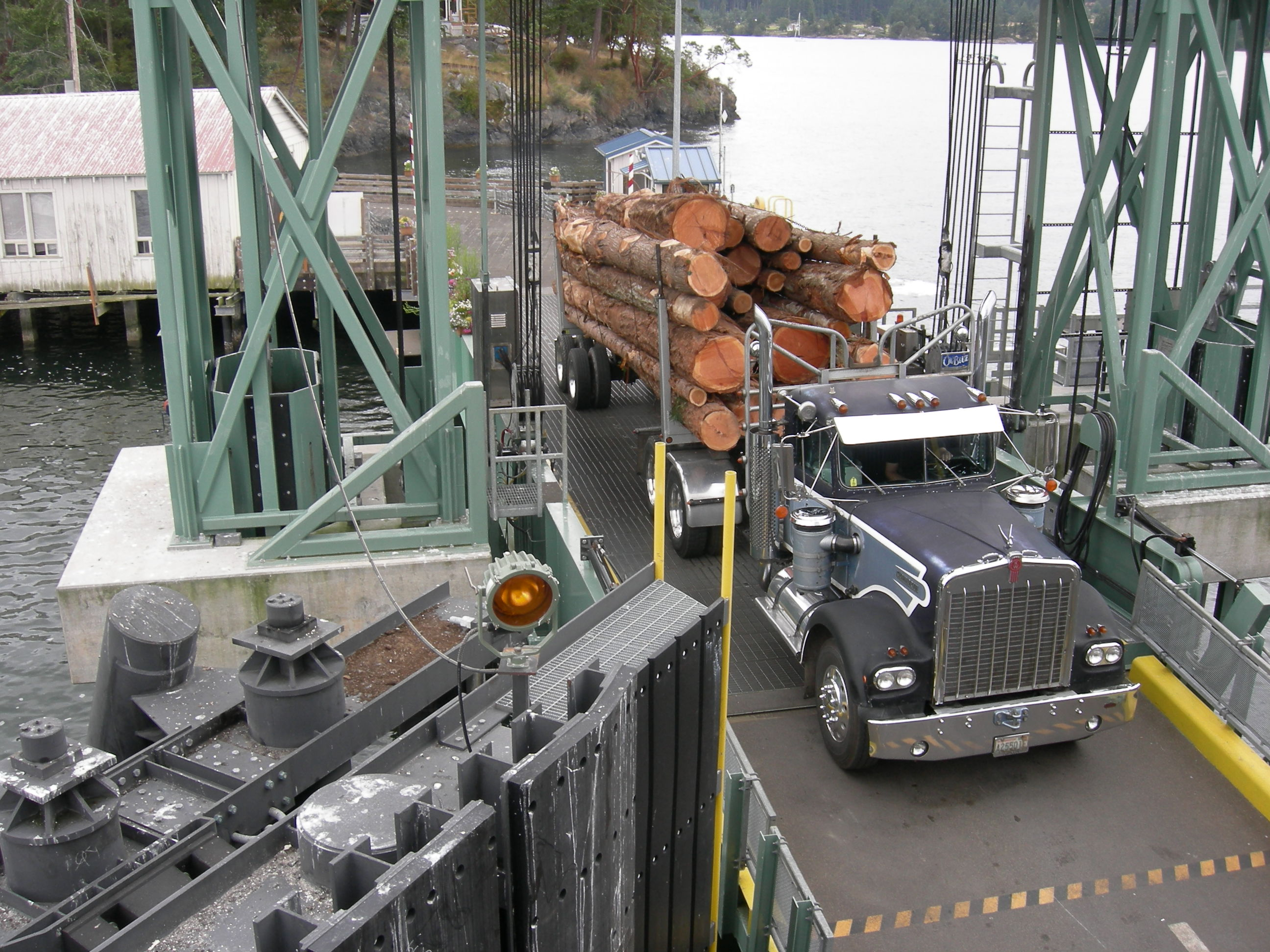
Logging truck on Shaw Island ferry dock

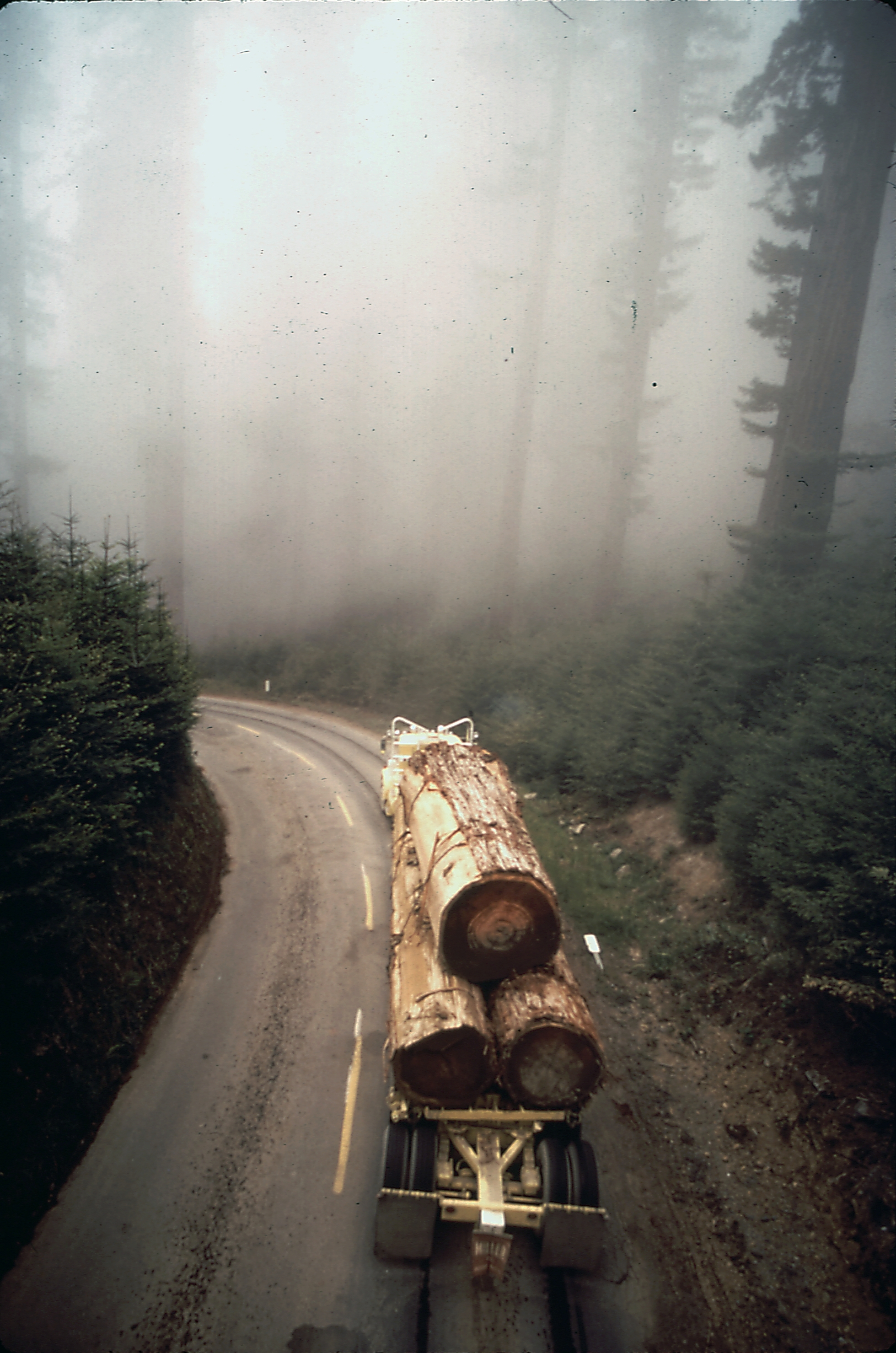
Logging trucks move through park from cutting near park boundary

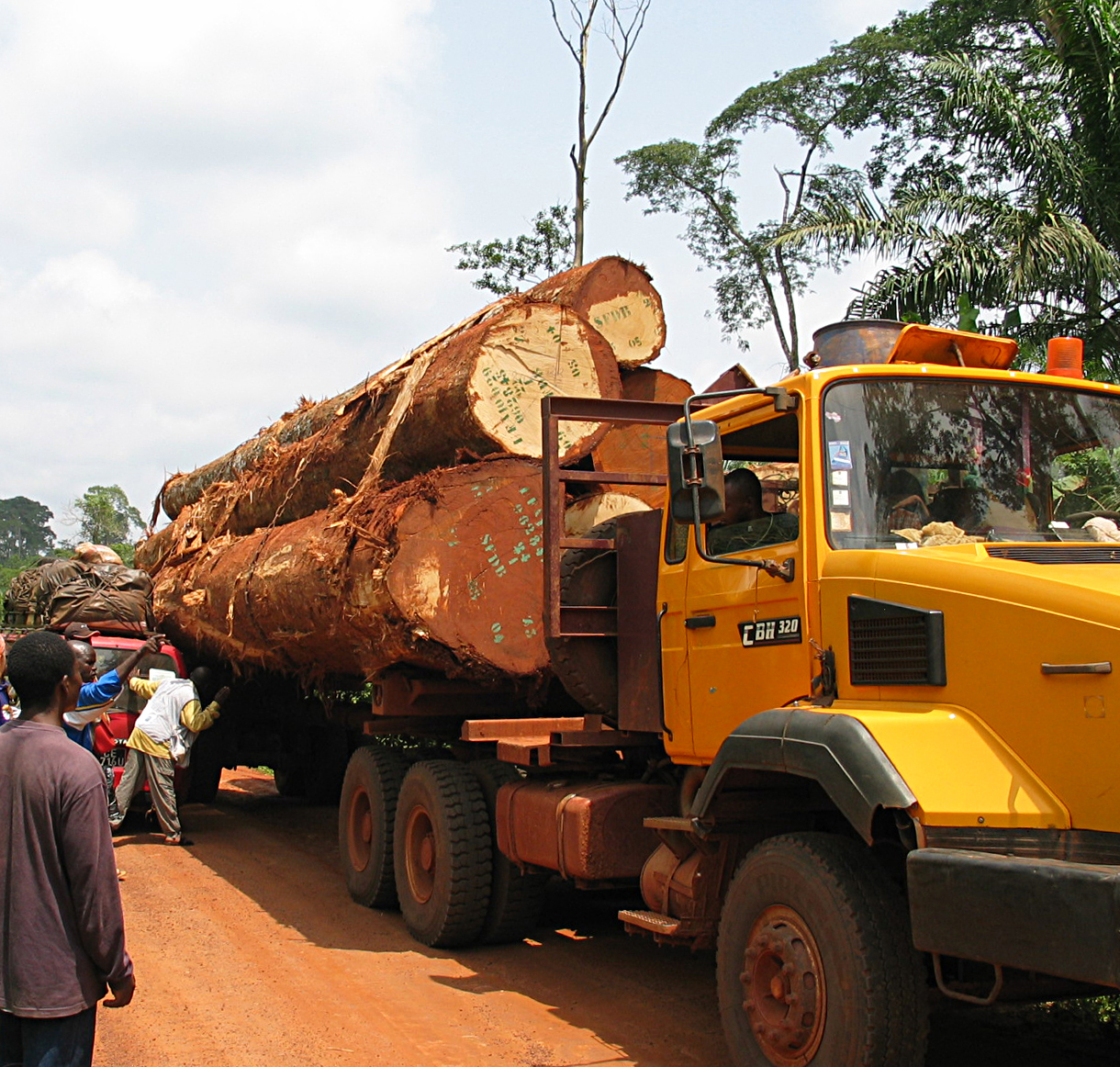
Logging truck and bush taxi accident

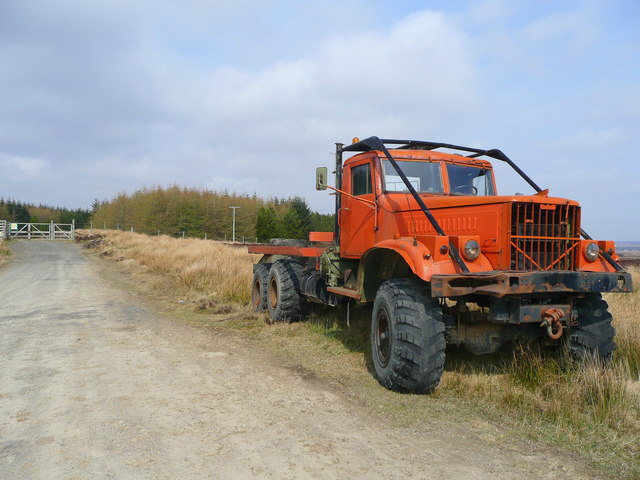
Three axle KrAZ-255B logging truck

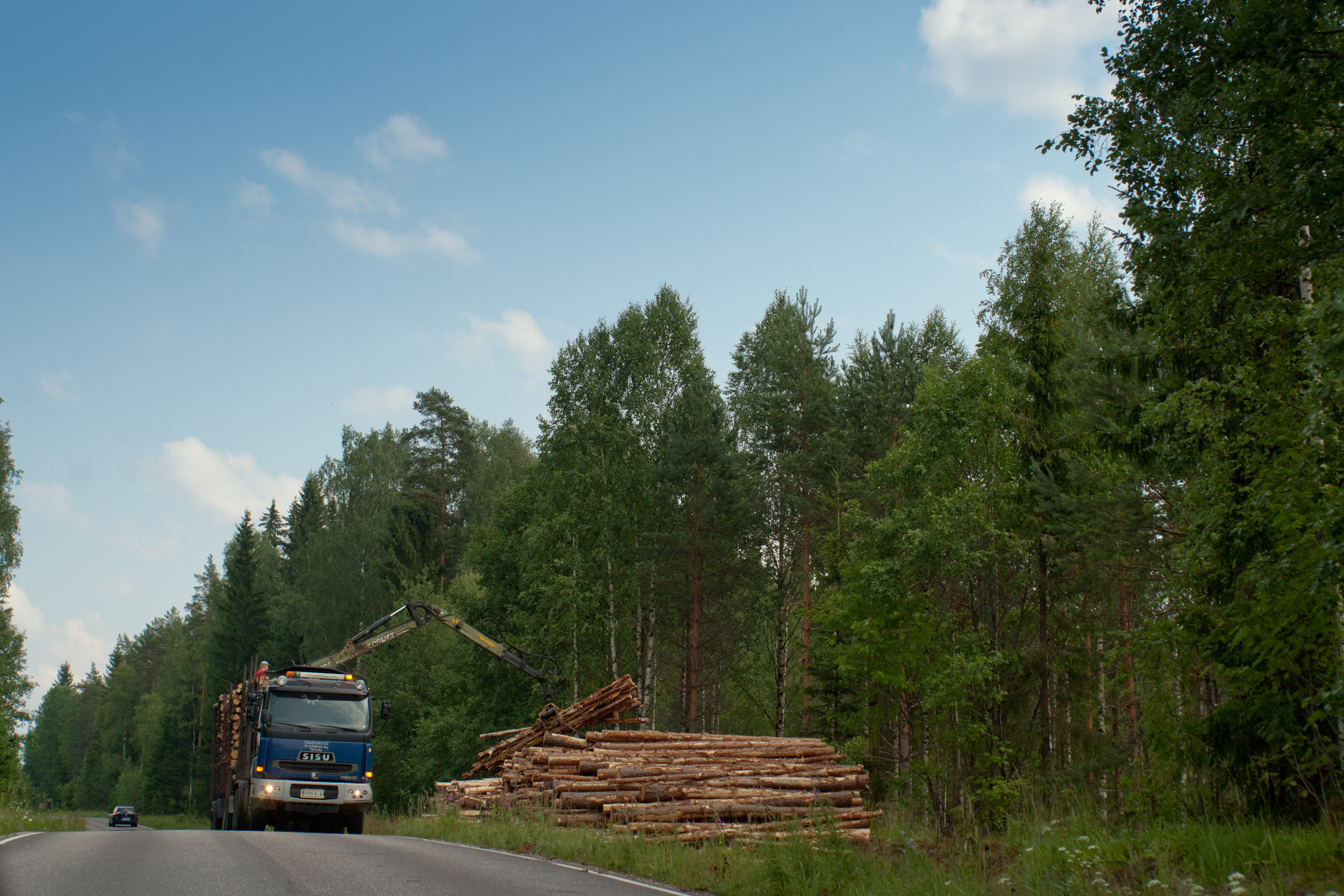
Sisu with a hydraulic crane

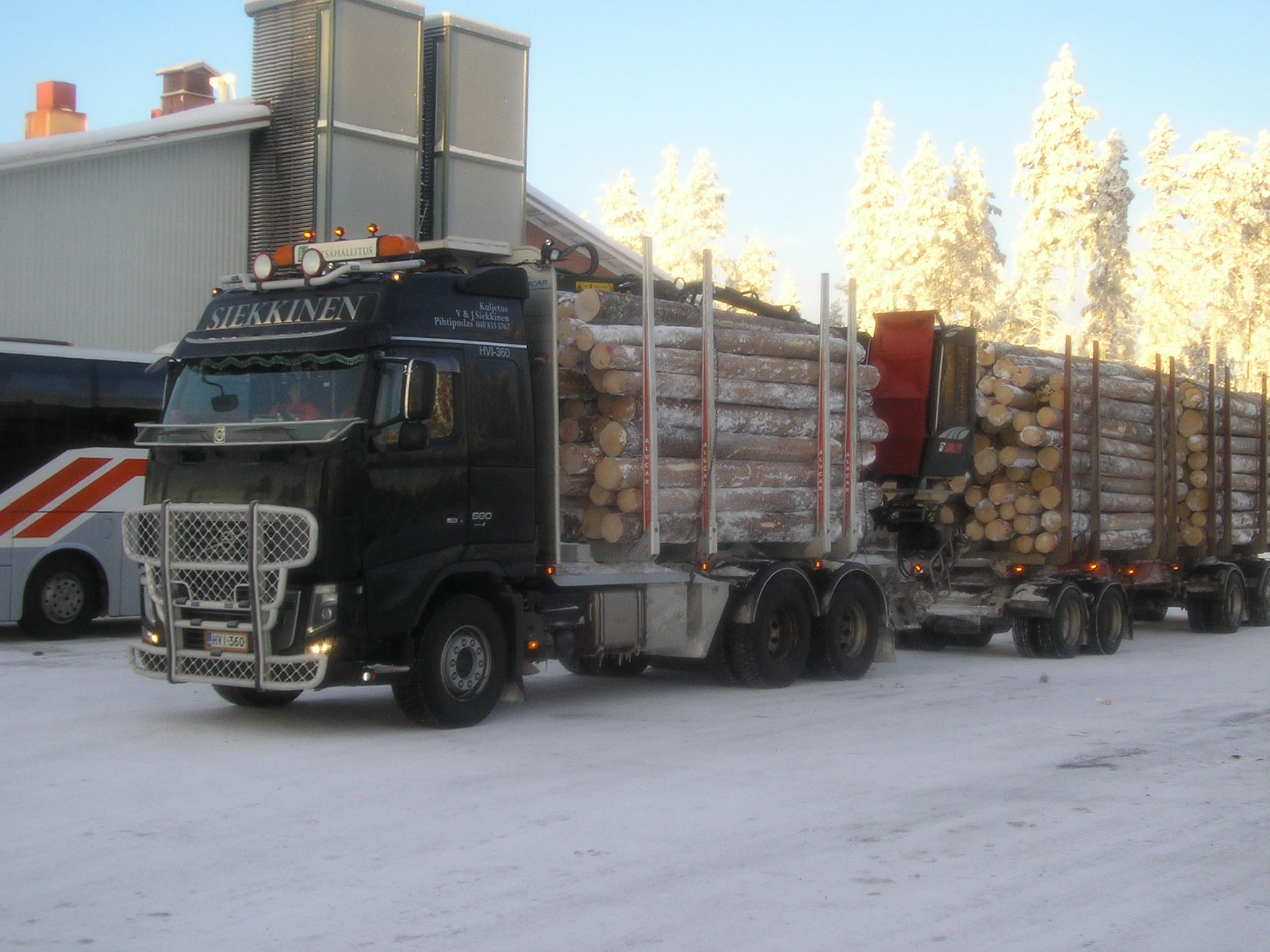
A 60 ton Volvo FH16 with bullbar

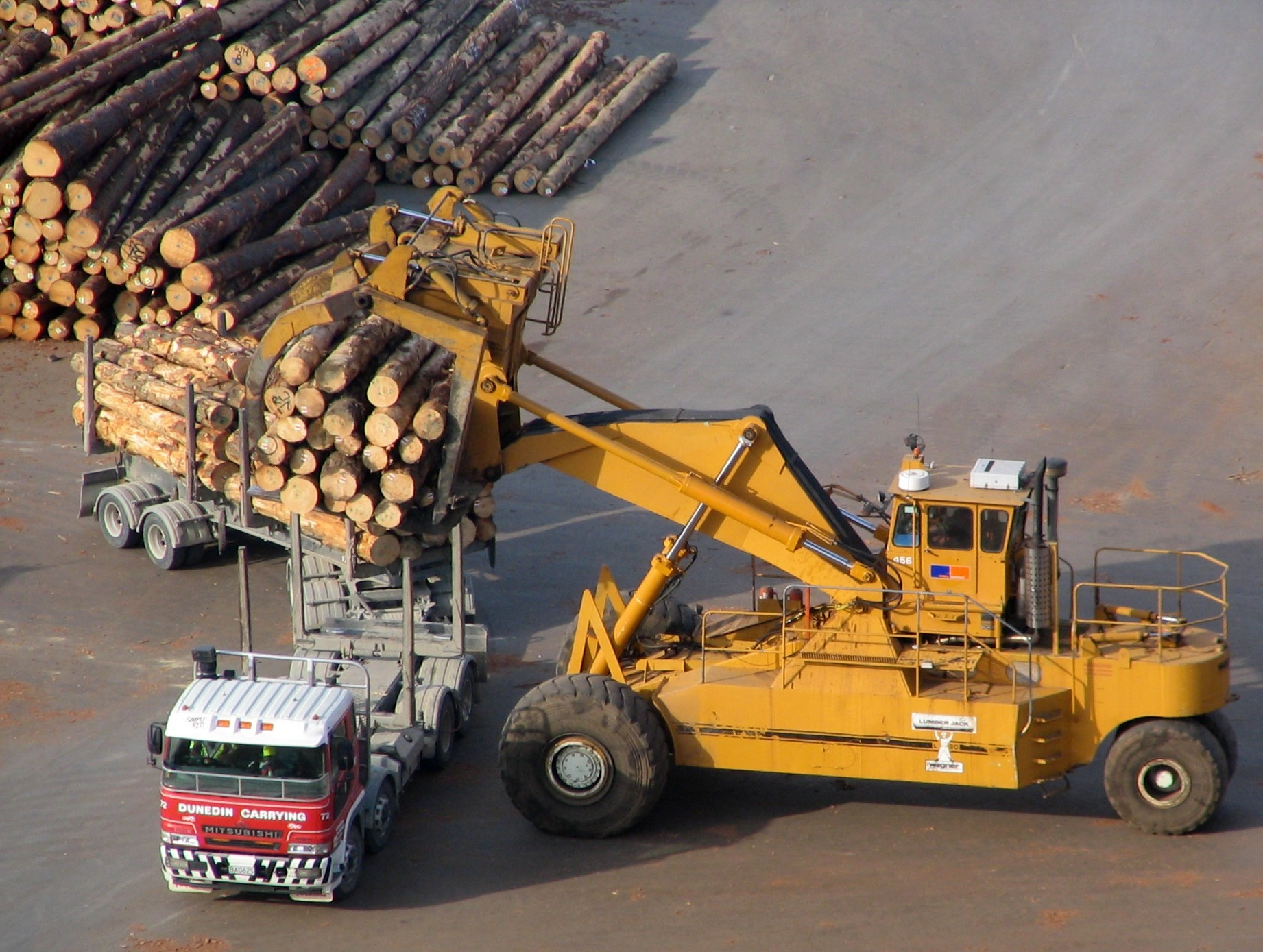
Mitsubishi 8x4 unloaded in Port Chalmers, New Zealand

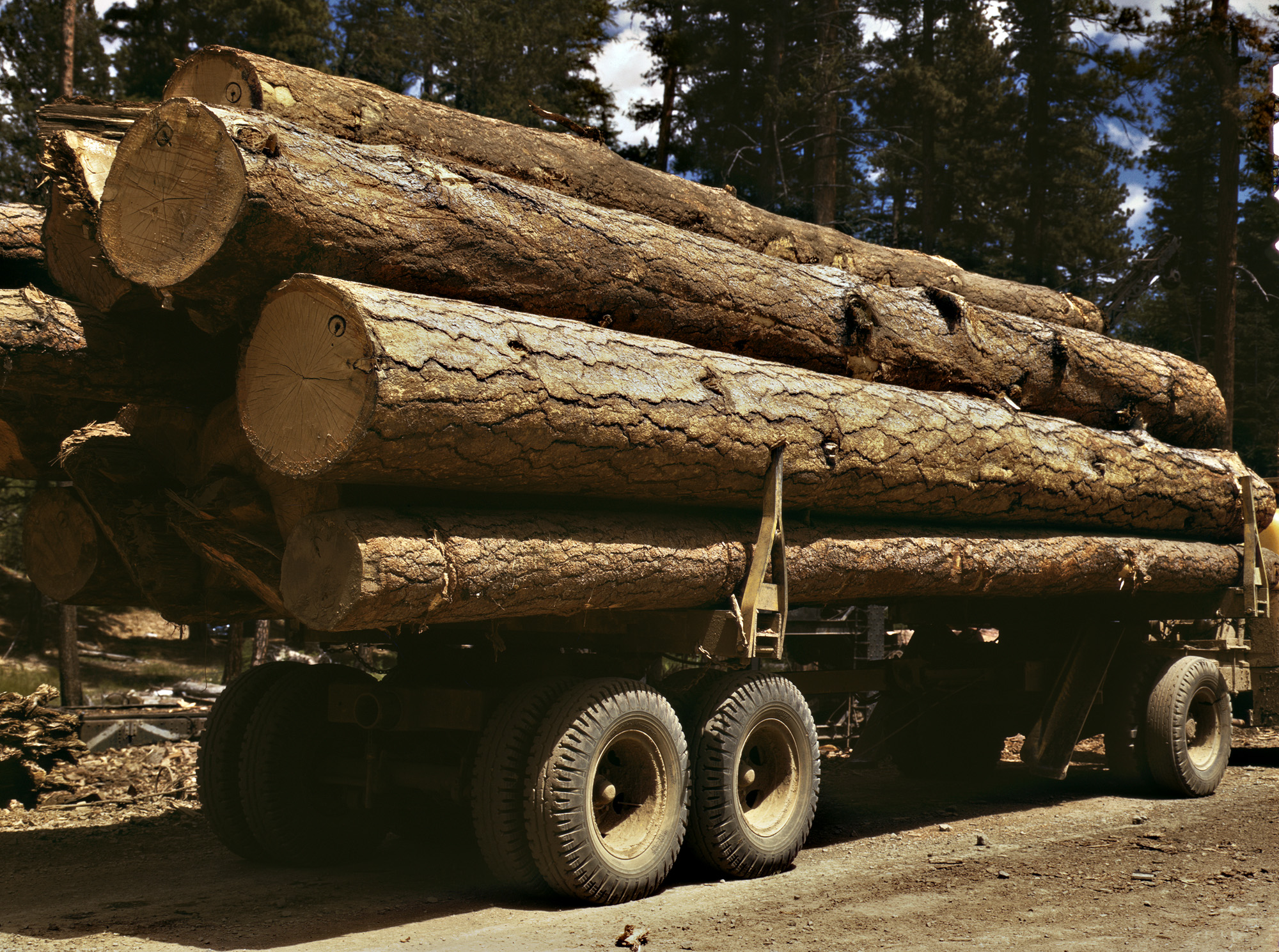
Truckload of ponderosa pine, Malheur National Forest, 1942

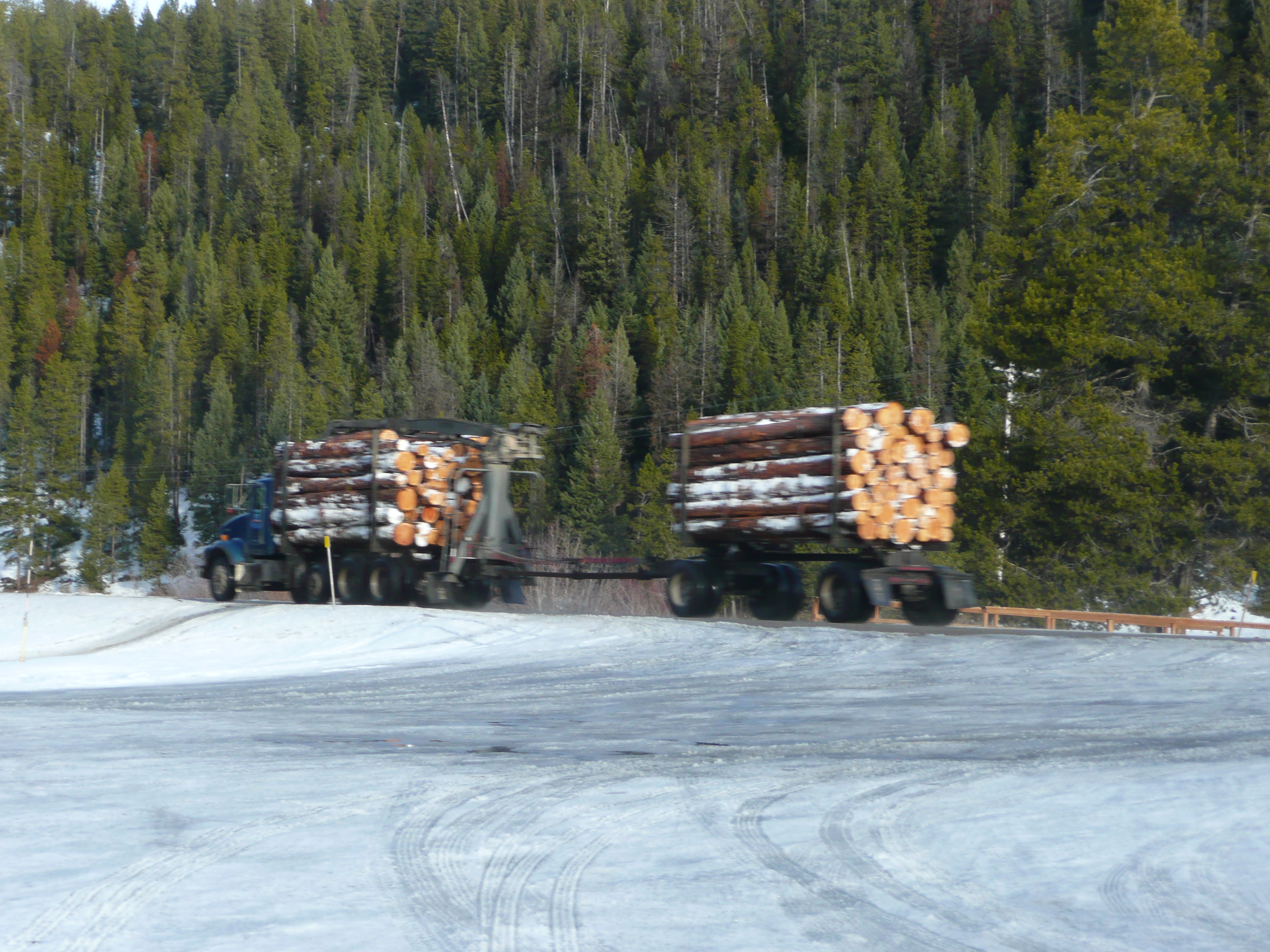
Straight truck with log loader and pup trailer, Montana, 2011

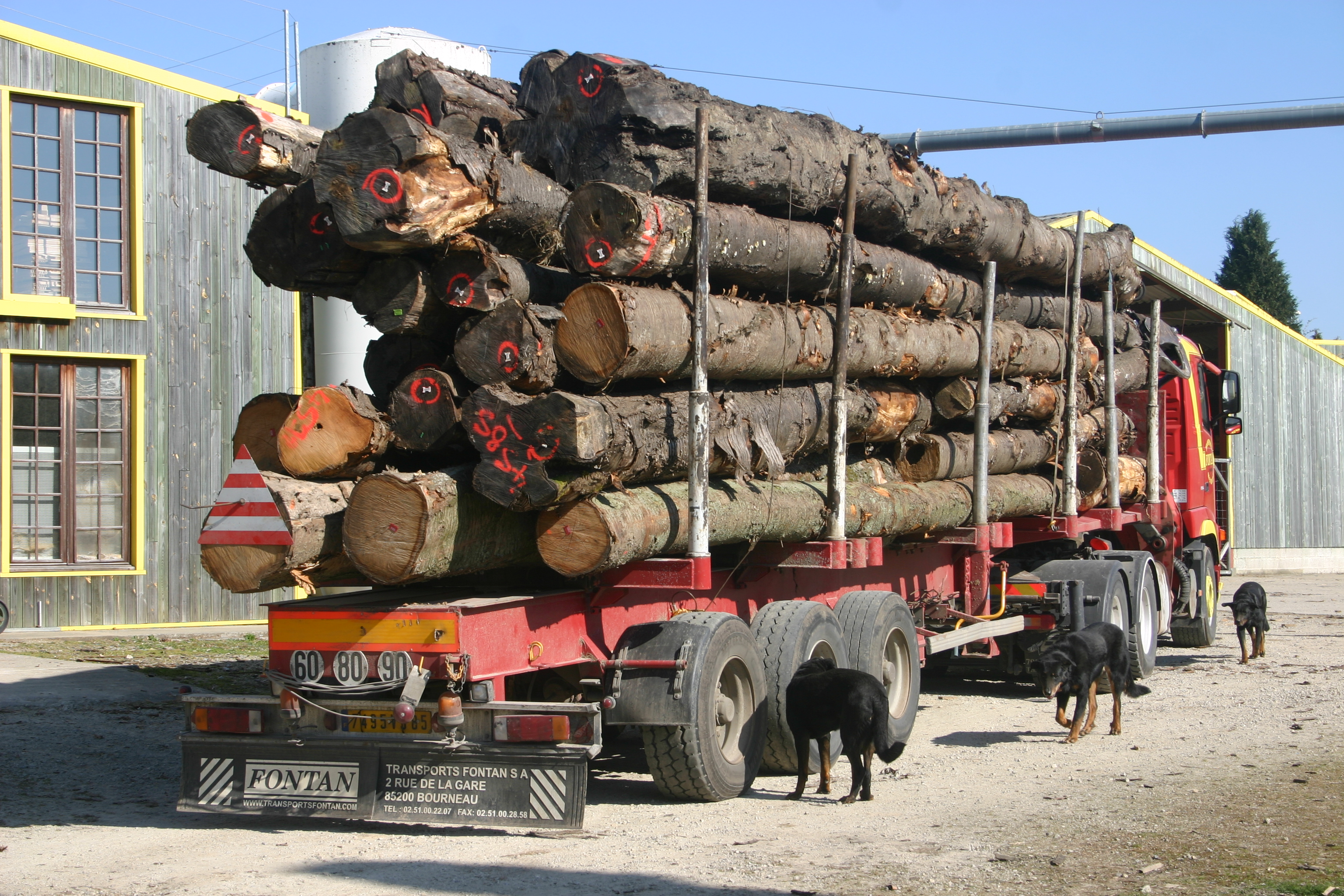
French logging truck

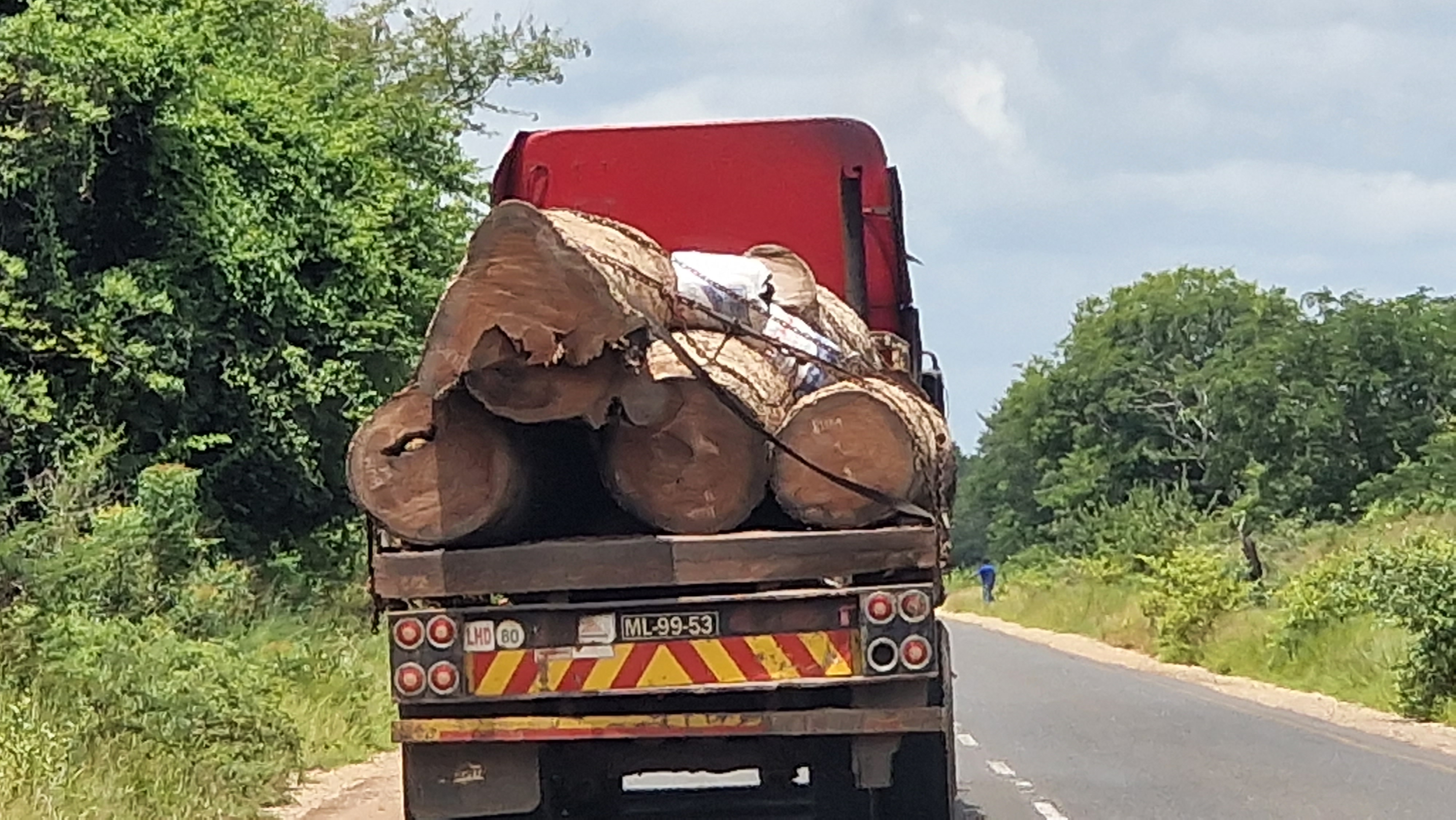
Logging truck transporting timber in Mozambique

== See also ==
- Flatbed truck
- Hayes Truck
- Forwarder
- Logging road
- Pacific Trucks
- Side stake
