= Challenger Manufacturing =

Canadian manufacturer of heavy trucks

Challenger Manufacturing Ltd. was a British Columbia–based Canadian manufacturer of heavy trucks, that built both highway and off road trucks, particularly for the logging industry, under the Challenger, Custom Built for Heavy Industry, brand.

Challenger was founded by John Casanave in Port Alberni, Vancouver Island, in 1987. They began to rebuild Hayes, Pacific and Kenworth heavy trucks, and later moved to manufacture sturdy, easy to maintain trucks using OEM components, like Mack or Cummins engines.

Challenger was active from 1987 to 1994, but only 14 units seem have been made. A later attempt in Australia to revive the make, marketing it as Extreme Heavy Duty Trucks, was eventually unsuccessful.
