= Moreland Motor Truck Company =

Defunct American motor vehicle manufacturer

- Type: Truck Company
- Industry: Manufacturing
- Founded: 1911; 115 years ago
- Founder: Watt L. Moreland
- Defunct: 1940; 86 years ago
- Headquarters: Burbank, California, US
- Products: Trucks

The Moreland Motor Truck Company of Burbank, California, was originally located in Los Angeles. The Moreland trucks were sold worldwide.

== History ==
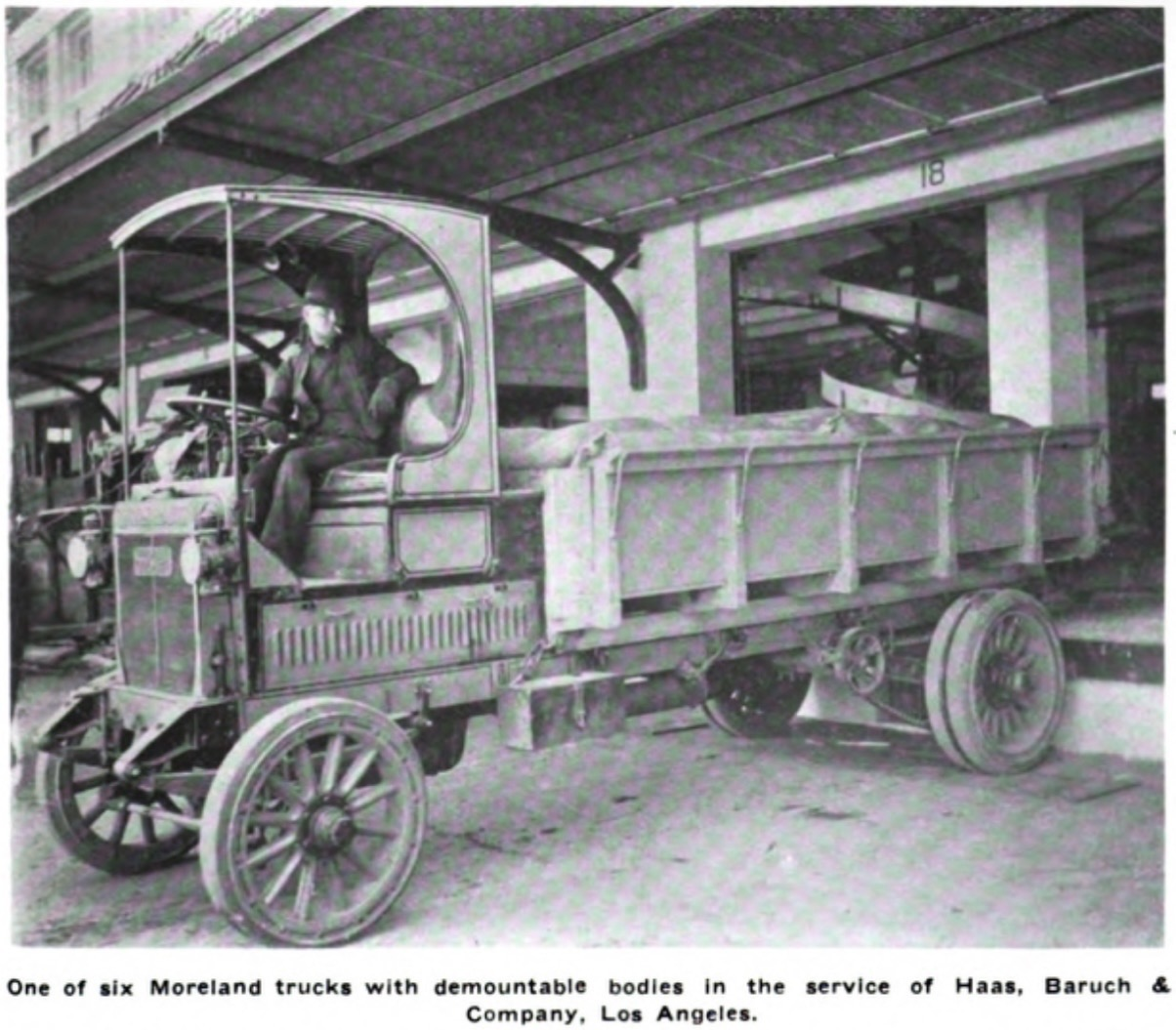
Moreland truck (1913)

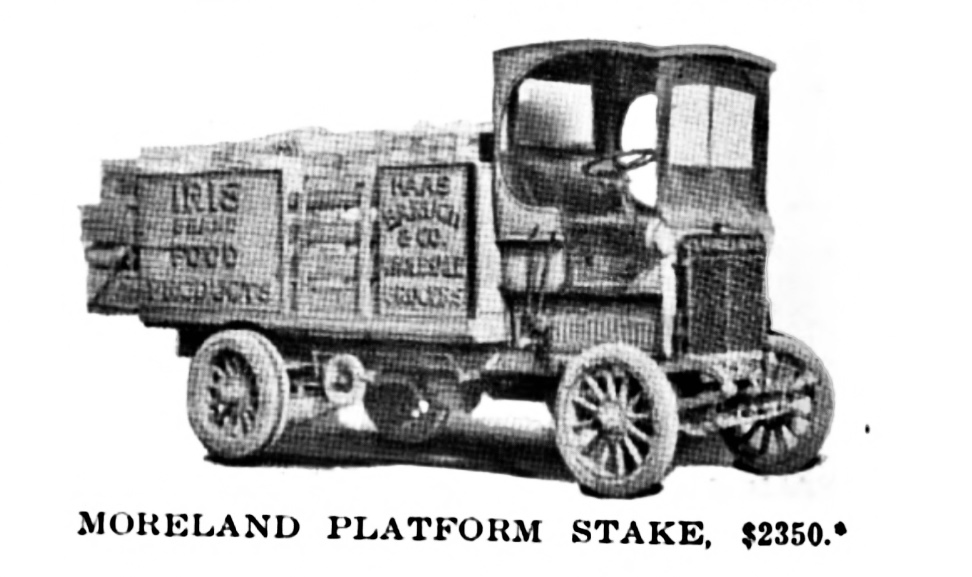
Moreland 3t or 3,5 t (1911-1914)

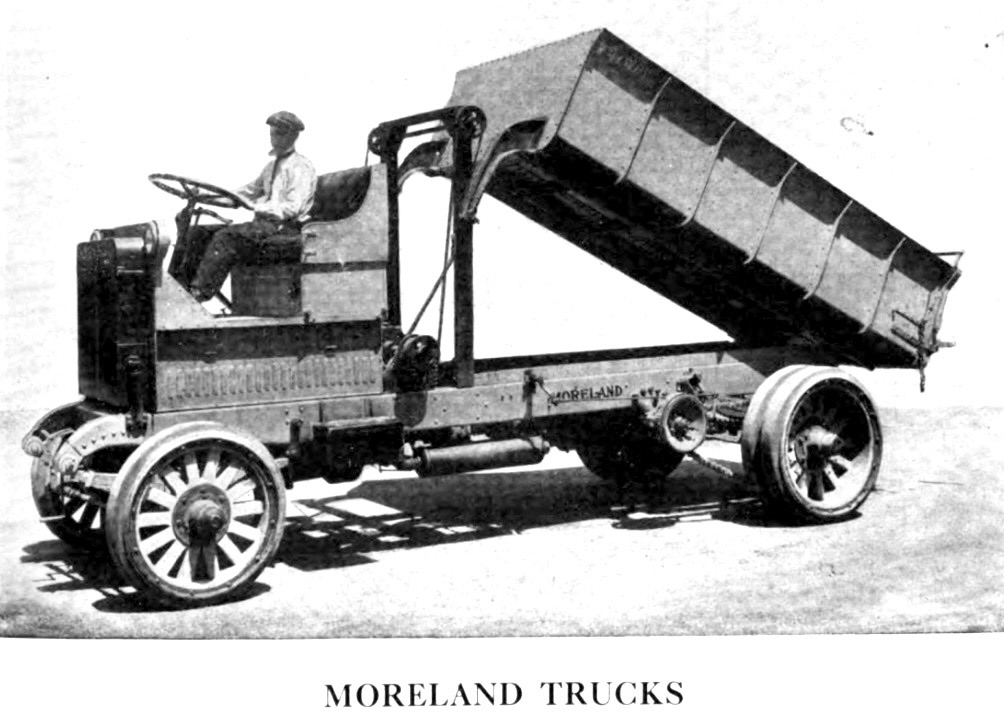
Moreland truck (1914)

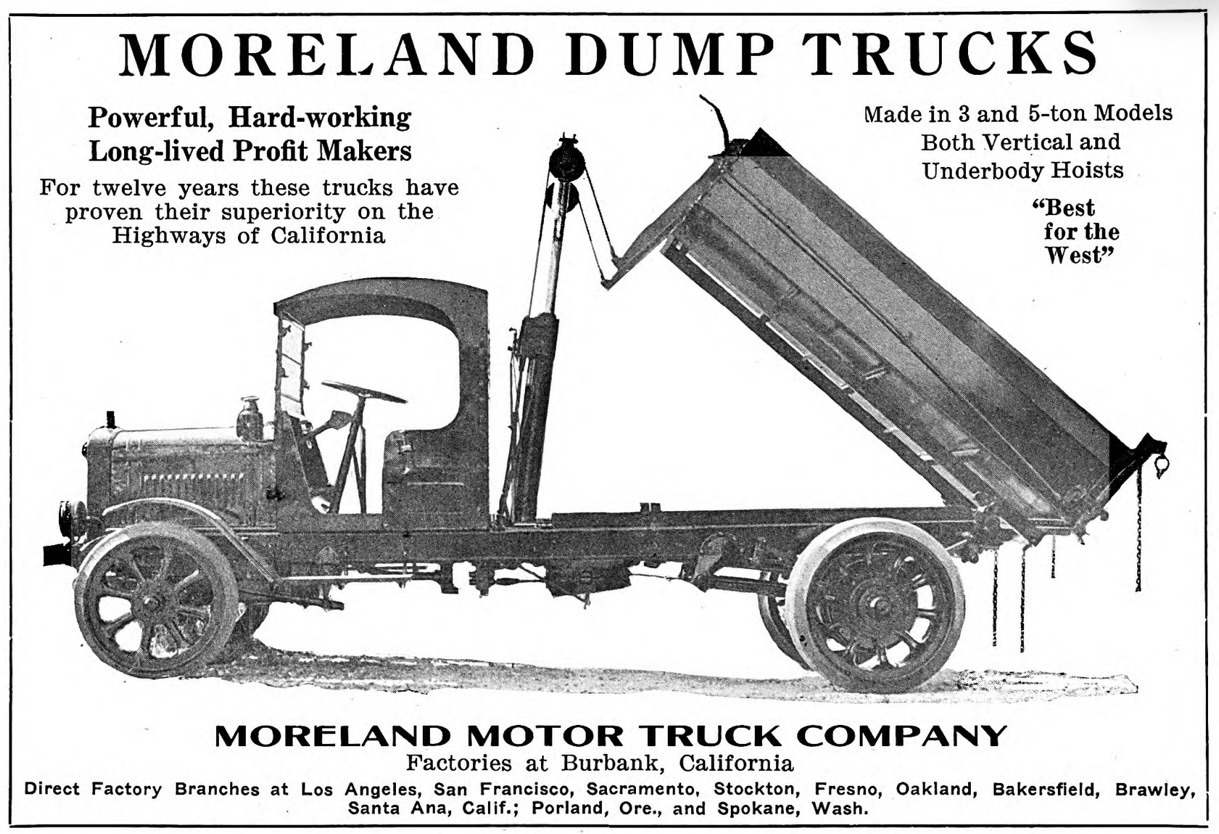
Moreland advertisement (1924)

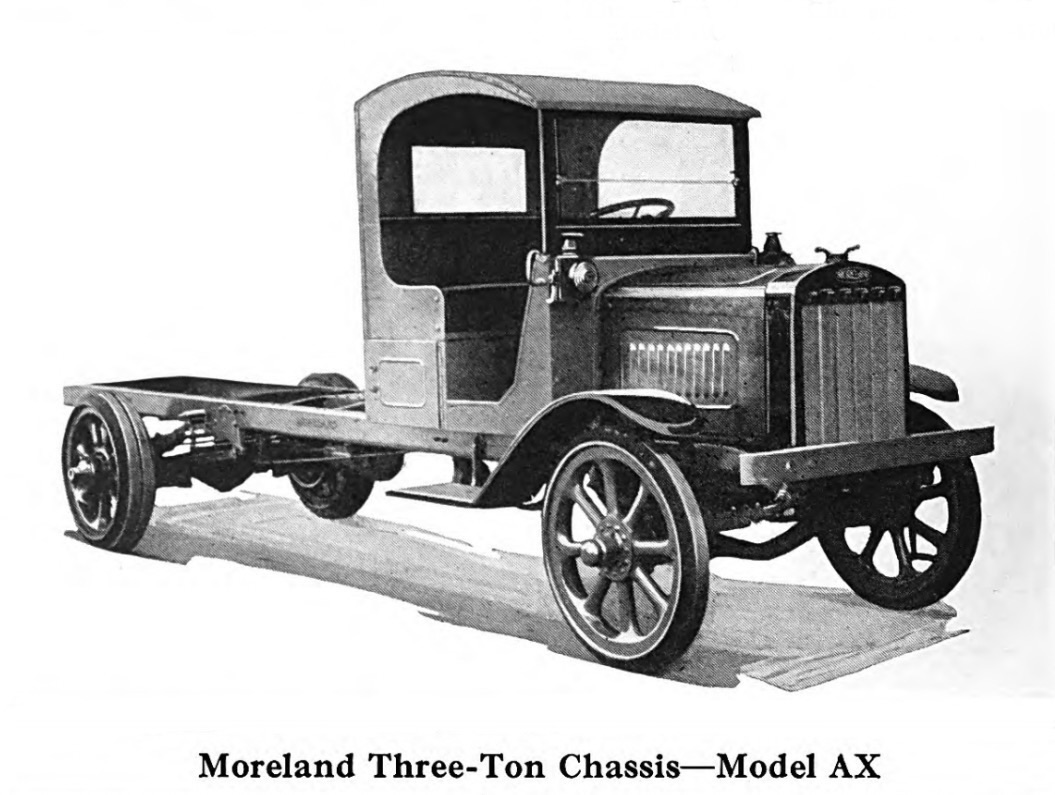
Moreland Model AX (1922-1925)

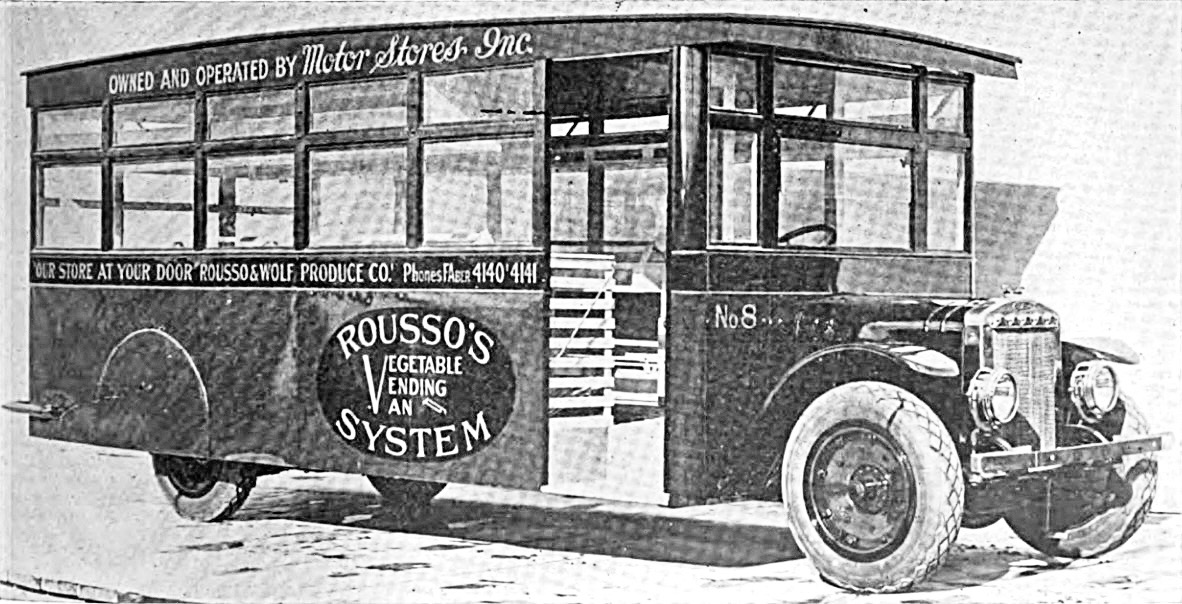
Moreland bus chassis (1925)

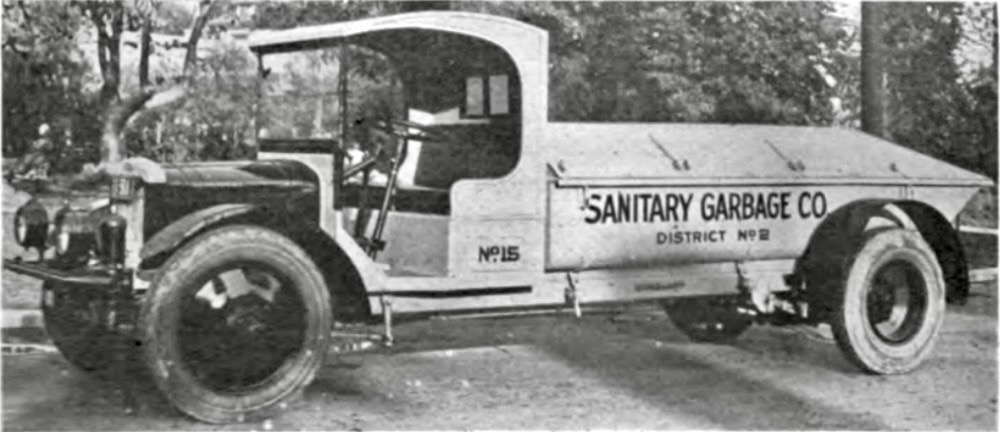
Moreland truck (1925)

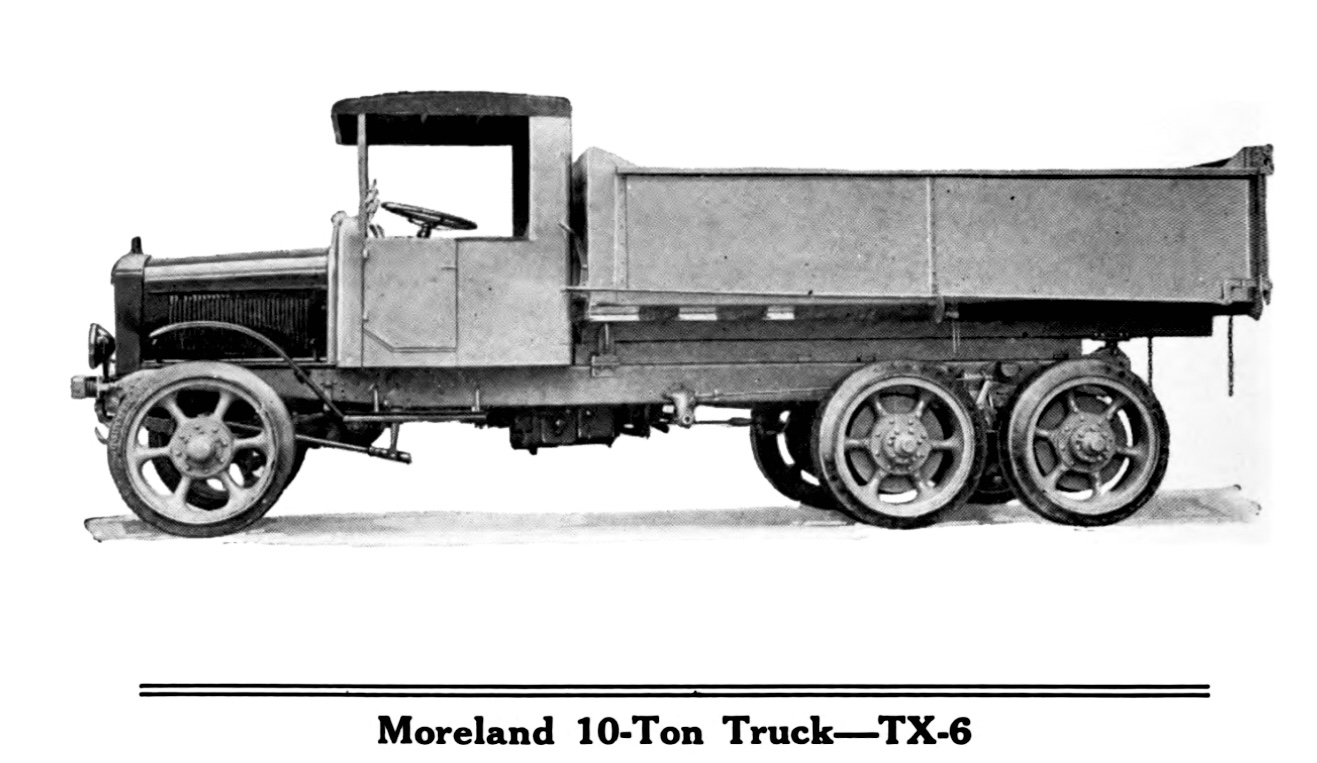
Moreland TX-6 (1926–1928)

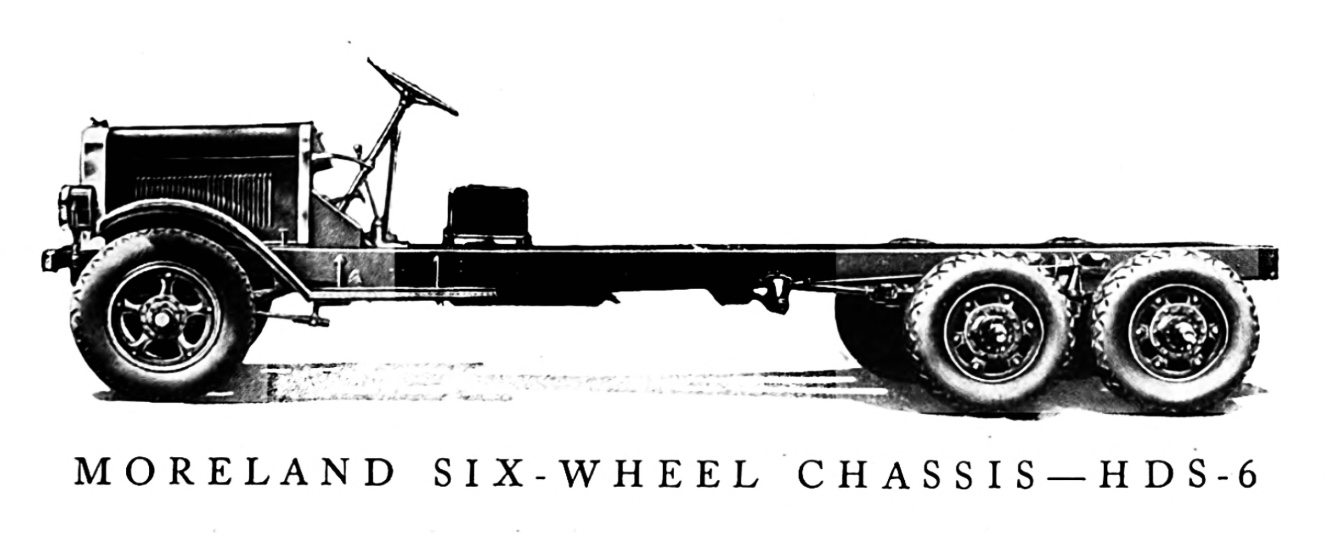
Moreland HDS-6 (1929)

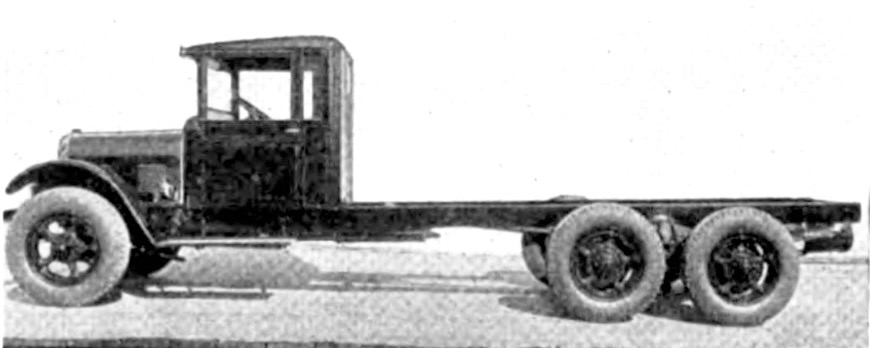
Moreland BD-7 (1930-1931)

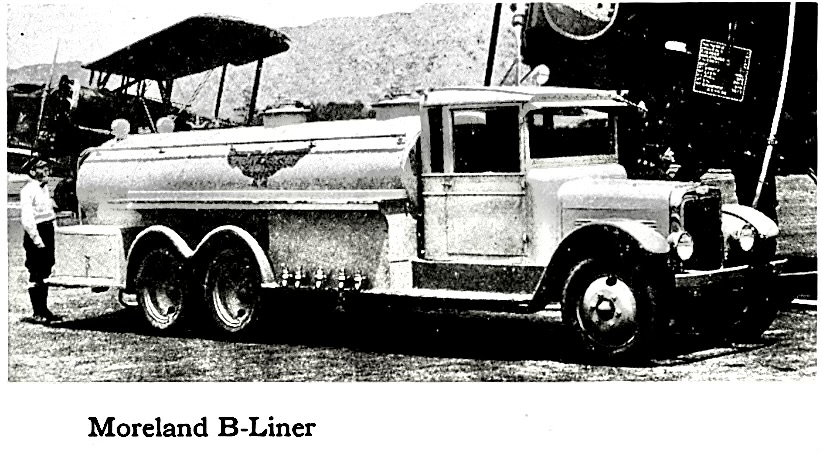
Moreland BD-7 (1930-1931) B-Liner

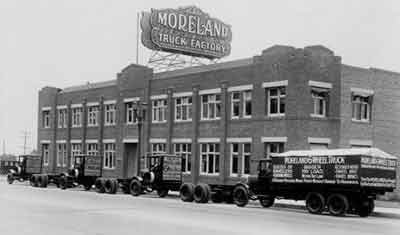
Moreland plant

The Moreland Motor Truck Company started in Los Angeles in 1911. Moreland was an innovative company that produced 70% of its trucks on-site, they introduced the "Gasifier" in the early 1900s, which allowed gas engines to run on petroleum distillates, similar to kerosene. The trucks came with a one-year warranty, much better than the standard 90 day warranty of most truck companies at the time. From 1911 to 1915, 1,200 trucks were produced. By September 1915, 1,500 trucks had already been produced.

In 1917 Watt Loren Moreland was planning to move his business to Alhambra, California. When Burbank city officials heard about this news they offered Moreland 25 acres (100,000 m^{2}) of land free of cost, located on the corner of San Fernando Blvd. and Alameda Ave. The city of Burbank raised $25,000 to pay for the land, buildings were constructed and the truck company moved in, after which Moreland trucks carried the "Made in Burbank" label. The factory was still surrounded by acres of farms.

Along with Kenworth, Kleiber, and Fageol, Moreland helped build the image of the "Western Truck". Early models consisted of 1 1/2, 3, 3 1/2, and 5 ton sizes, with larger models featuring chain drive and driver-over-engine cabs. Hercules and Continental engines were paired with Brown-Lipe-Chapin transmissions. The 6 ton model was the largest in production by 1924, and in that same year they created a 6-wheeler double-decker bus chassis with a 6-cylinder Continental engine, Westinghouse air brakes, Lockheed hydraulics, and a 60-passenger body. Due to the projected cost (and the assumed low sales volume), the bus was not produced, but the 6-wheeler concept continued on in 1925 with the TX6 truck. Powered by a Continental 14H engine, it featured an equalizing rocker bogie designed by Moreland which pivoted from the middle of semi-elliptic springs. The TX6 was 10-ton rated and sold for around $7,000, with a 6-ton version introduced later that year. The 6-wheeler vehicles led to increased sales both in the United States and from other countries in Central America and South America as well as the Philippines and Australia.

Moreland also made trailers, commercial bodywork, smaller trucks such as the 4-wheeler Ace (3,800 lb, Continental engine) and the 4-ton Californian (Hercules engine). In 1929 the company had its best production year with almost 1,000 trucks, buses, and trailers delivered but less than 40 per year were sold by the mid-30s. Fageol and Moreland entered into talks of a merger in 1931 but nothing ever became of this. Moreland started to focus more on trailers and body work, with later trucks all being custom built. After 1941 the company became a parts & service corporation.

The Moreland buildings were used by the Vega Aircraft Corporation in World War II, the Weston Biscuit Company bought the plant in 1947, and in 1970 it was purchased by the Menasco Motors Company to build landing gear. The original Moreland Truck Company buildings were demolished around 1999.

== Moreland products ==
The pre-assigned serial numbers only indicate the maximum possible production quantity.

Year	Production figures	Model	Load capacity	Serial number
1911			to	
1912			to	
1913			to	
1914	59	D	0,75 to	1001 to 1059
	85	14 B	1,5 to	1201 to 1234 and 1238 to 1288
	101	14 K	2,5 to	1401 to 1501
	22	G	3 to	1701 to 1722
	2	G	3,5 to	1723 to 1724
	5	G	4 to	1725 to 1729
	12	J	5 to	1901 to 1912
1915	35	15D	0,75 to	2001 to 2035
	61	15B	1,5 to	2201 to 2261
	79	15C	2,5 to	2401 to 2479
	44	14G	3,5 to	1731 to 1735 and 2701 to 2739
		J	5 to	2901 to
1916	28	15 D	0,75 to	2036 to 2063
	14	N	0,75 to	2101 to 2111 and 2113 to 2115
	23+	16N	0,75 to	2122 to and 2116 to 2138
	35	NA	1 to	2065 to 2099
	138	16B	1,5 to	2262 to 2399
	220	16C	2,5 to	2480 to 2699
	131	16G	4 to	2740 to 2870
	9	16J	5 to	2902 to 2910
1917	73	17N	1 to	3001 to 3073
	199	17B	1,5 to	3201 to 3399
	370	17C	2,5 to	3401 to 3699 and 4401 to 4430 and 4450 to 4490
	1,026	17G	4 to	2871 to 2896 and 3701 to 3899 and 4730 to 4750
	17	16J	5 to	2911 to 2927
1918		17N	1 to	↑
		17B	1,5 to	↑
		17C	2,5 to	↑
		17G	4 to	↑
		16J	5 to	↑
1919	10	19-N	1 to	5001 to 5010
	151	19-B	1,5 to	4200 to 4350
	200	19-C	2,5 to	4500 to 4699
	100	19-G	4 to	4751 to 4850
	26	19-J	5 to	2928 to 2943 and 4901 to 4910
1920	39	20-N	1 to	5011 to 5049
	191	20-B	1,5 to	4351 to 4399 and 5201 to 5342
	224	20-C	2,5 to	5400 to 5623
	127	20-G	4 to	4851 to 4899 and 5700 to 5777
	13	20-J	5 to	4911 to 4923
1921	103	21-B	1,5 to	6201 to 6303
	121	21-C	2,5 to	6401 to 6521
	46	21-H	3,5 to	6701 to 6746
	11	21-J	5 to	6901 to 6911
1922	165	Road Runner	1 to	7000 to 7164
	124	BX	1,5 to	7501 to 7624
	64	EX	2 to	8000 to 8063
	160	AX	3 to	9001 to 9160
	120	RX	5 to	10000 to 10119
1923	147	Road Runner	1 to	7160 to 7306
		18	1,25 to	
	184	BX	1,5 to	7625 to 7808
	103	EX	2 to	8063 to 8165
	270	AX	3 to	9161 to 9430
	182	RX	5 to	10120 to 10301
1924	55	RR	1 to	7307 to 7361
	15	BX	1,5 to	7809 to 7823
	32	EX	2 to	8166 to 8197
	55	EXX	2,5 to	11001 to 11055
	138	AX	3 to	9431 to 9568
	50	AXX	4 to	12001 to 12050
	87	RX	5 to	10302 to 10388
	10	⟨RC⟩	26 Ps Bus	14001 to 14010
	17	⟨EC⟩	21 Ps Bus	15001 to 15017
	15	⟨AC⟩	25 Ps Bus	16001 to 16015
1925	24	RR	1 to	7375 to 7398
	29	BX	1,5 to	7826 to 7854
	18	EXX	2,5 to	11075 to 11092
	31	AX	3 to	9575 to 9605
	51	AXX	4 to	12075 to 12125
	10	RX	5 to	10400 to 10409
	25	RR	1 to	18501 to 18525
	38	BX (6)	1,5 to	19501 to 19538
		EXX (6)	2,5 to	11501 to
	18	AXX (6)	4 to	12751 to 12768
	11	SX	6 to	13251 to 13261
	24	TX	10 to	13503 to 13526
	4	⟨RC⟩	16 Ps bus	14025 to 14028
		⟨EC⟩	21 Ps bus	15025 to
1926	22	RC6	1 to	14551 to 14572
	361	RR6	1 to	18551 to 18911
	115	BX6	1,5 to	19551 to 19665
	10	EXX4	2,5 to	11101 to 11110
	11	EXX6	2,5 to	11515 to 11525
	40	AXX4	5 to	12120 to 12159
	90	AXX6	5 to	12770 to 12859
	10	SX4	6 to	13265 to 13274
	31	SX6	6 to	13760 to 13790
	42	TX4	10 to	13530 to 13571
	44	TX6	10 to	13665 to 13708
1927	10	RC6	1 to	14576 to 14585
	475	RR6	1 to	21001 to 21475
	105	BX6	1,5 to	19676 to 19780
	75	EXX6	2,5 to	11526 to 11600
	92	AXX6	5 to	12866 to 12957
	16	SX6	6 to	13801 to 13816
	20	TX6	10 to	13711 to 13720 and 13951 to 13960
Sum	793, (772 sold)			
1928		RC6	2 to	14601 to
		RR6	2 to	21501 to
		B6	2,5 to	23001 to
		E6	3,5 to	24001 to
		EX6	4 to	24501 to
		H6	5 to	25001 to
		HD6	6 to	25501 to
		SD6	10 to	26001 to
		TD6	10 to	26501 to
Sum	(778 sold)			
1929		Ace	1,25 to	20011 to
		RC6	2 to	27001 to
		RR6	2 to	21740 to
		B6	2,5 to	23284 to
		E6	3,5 to	24041 to
		EX6	4 to	24561 to
		ED6	6 to	24755 to
		H6	5 to	25063 to
		HDS6	8 to	25530 to
		SD6	10 to	26027 to
		TD6	10 to	26520 to
1930		ED-7	6 to	to
		BD-7	5 to	
1931		B-8	3 to	to
		BD-7	5 to	
1932		Road Runner RR-8	1,5 to	to
		Road Runner RR-10	2 to	to
		B-13	2,5-3,5 to	to
		B-16	4-4,5 to	to
		E-16	4-4,5 to	to
		E-19	5-5,5 to	to
		H-24	5,5-6,5 to	to
1933			to	to
1934		B-13	3 to	to
1935			to	to
1936			to	to
1937			to	to
1938		TA 420 CD	to	to
1939		TA 420 CD	to	to
1940		TA 420 CD	to	to
1941		TA 420 CD	to	to
