= Kleiber Motor Truck Company =

Defunct American truck company

The Kleiber Motor Truck Company
- Formerly: Kleiber & Company (predecessor)
- Type: Private
- Industry: Automotive
- Predecessor: Kleiber & Company
- Founded: 1913 (as The Kleiber Motor Truck Company)
- Founder: Paul Kleiber
- Defunct: 1937
- Fate: Ceased operations due to economic factors and competition
- Headquarters: San Francisco, U.S.
- Products: Trucks, automobiles
- Brands: Kleiber
- Total equity: $175,000 (initial funding from sale of Kleiber & Co.) (1912)
- Number of employees: 350 (1923)
- Divisions: Fischer-Gaffney Body Company (for car production, 1924)

The Kleiber Motor Truck Company was founded by Paul Kleiber in 1913. Paul was born in Germany and worked as an apprentice blacksmith and wagon maker until immigrating to the United States in 1889. First working as a blacksmith and later as a distributor for the Gramm-Bernstein Company, Paul formed Kleiber & Company to manufacturer buggies and wagons in 1900. The company loaned out wagons to help people move their possessions after the 1906 San Francisco earthquake. In 1912 Kleiber and Company was sold for $175,000 which was used to fund the Kleiber Motor Truck Company on 1424 Folsom Street in San Francisco. A single vehicle, of Kleiber's own design, was produced in 1912 and sold to the Milwaukee Brewing Company. Kleiber trucks were purchased by several large companies, including Shell Oil, Del Monte Foods, & the Pacific Gas and Electric Company.

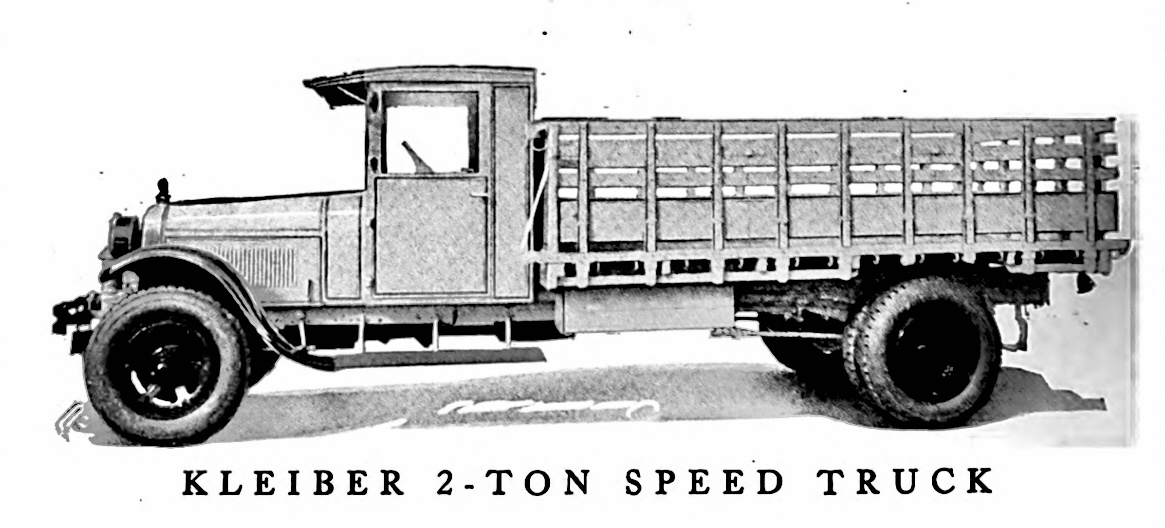
Kleiber 2t Speed (1928-1930)

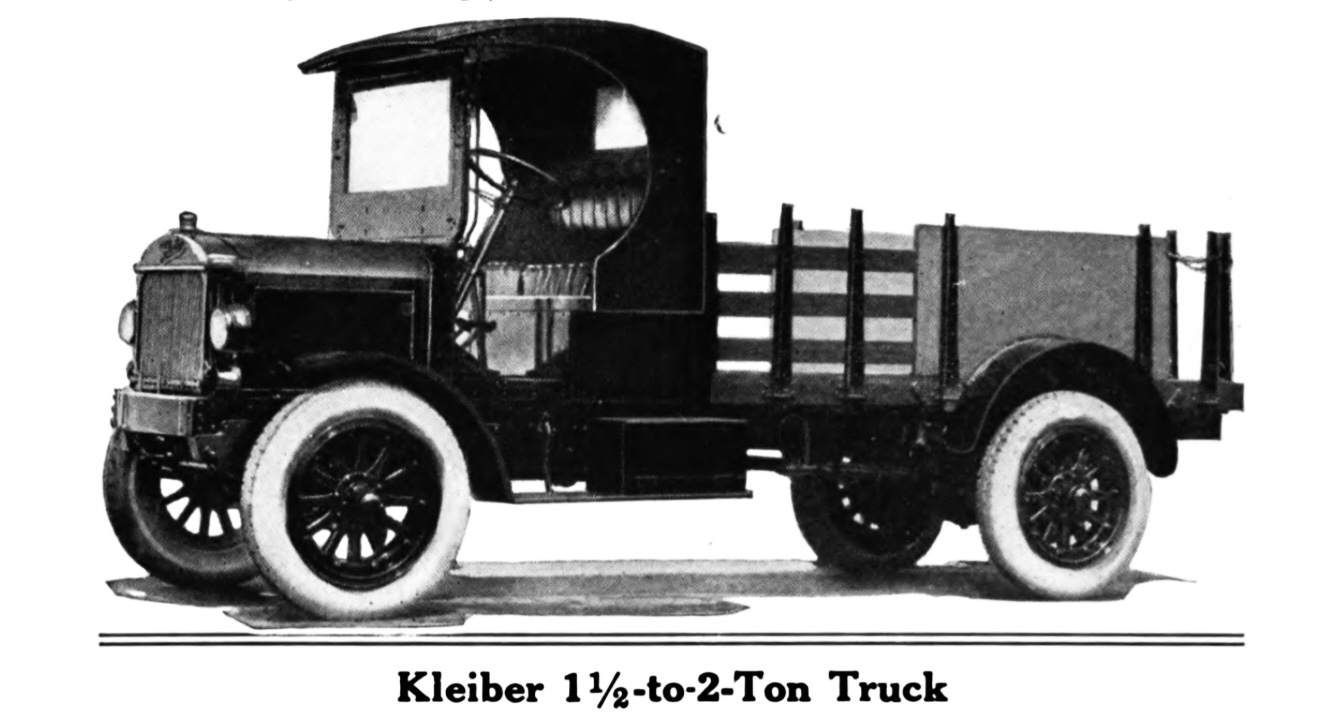
Kleiber 1,5t to 2t Speed Truck (1928-1929)

The company employed 350 workers by 1923, outgrowing its current facility. A new factory was built and Kleiber became the largest truck manufacturer west of the Mississippi River. In 1924 the decision was made to enter the car market with the formation of the Fischer-Gaffney Body Company. Unfortunately for Kleiber, the market was already over-saturated with vehicles. This, combined with the company's lack of advertising, caused Kleiber cars to often be overlooked amongst the myriad of other cars available at the time. The company produced a small number of hand-made automobiles between 1924-1929 and were billed as "Aristocratic in Appearance". These cars were powered by Continental Red Seal engines mated to Brown-Lipe-Chapin three speed transmissions. Keibler's factory may have been the first with a showroom, and buyers could tour the factory to see their cars being built.

San Francisco ordered two custom searchlight trucks for the fire department in 1928 at a cost of $18,000 a piece. They were called the Light Wagon #1 and Light Wagon #2. Both featured five 1,000 watt floodlights mounted on a swivel bar on top, an additional 2,000 watt floodlight, eight 400 watt portable floodlights, and four 500 foot reels of extension cables, powered by a Kohler 10,000 watt generator and a 4-cylinder engine. Light Wagon #1 was destroyed in an accident in 1950 and Light Wagon #2 served until 1968. The city also purchased a 1926 Kleiber Tractor to tow a 75-foot water tower (WT-3) designed by Henry H. Gorter for fire fighting. The truck and tower have been preserved on display by the San Francisco Fire Department Historical Society.

Kleiber's trucks sold well, but the refusal to use assembly line techniques led to the cars being rather expensive. A Kleiber car might sell for $2,100 when a comparable Ford Motor Company car sold for $500. Reuse of truck chassis gave the cars poor handling in comparison to other automobiles of the day. The company took a major hit with the Wall Street crash of 1929 and stopped making cars. Kleiber acquired the Studebaker franchise for San Francisco and continued to produce trucks but finally ceased operations in 1937.
