= Hayes Manufacturing Company =

Defunct Canadian manufacturer of heavy trucks

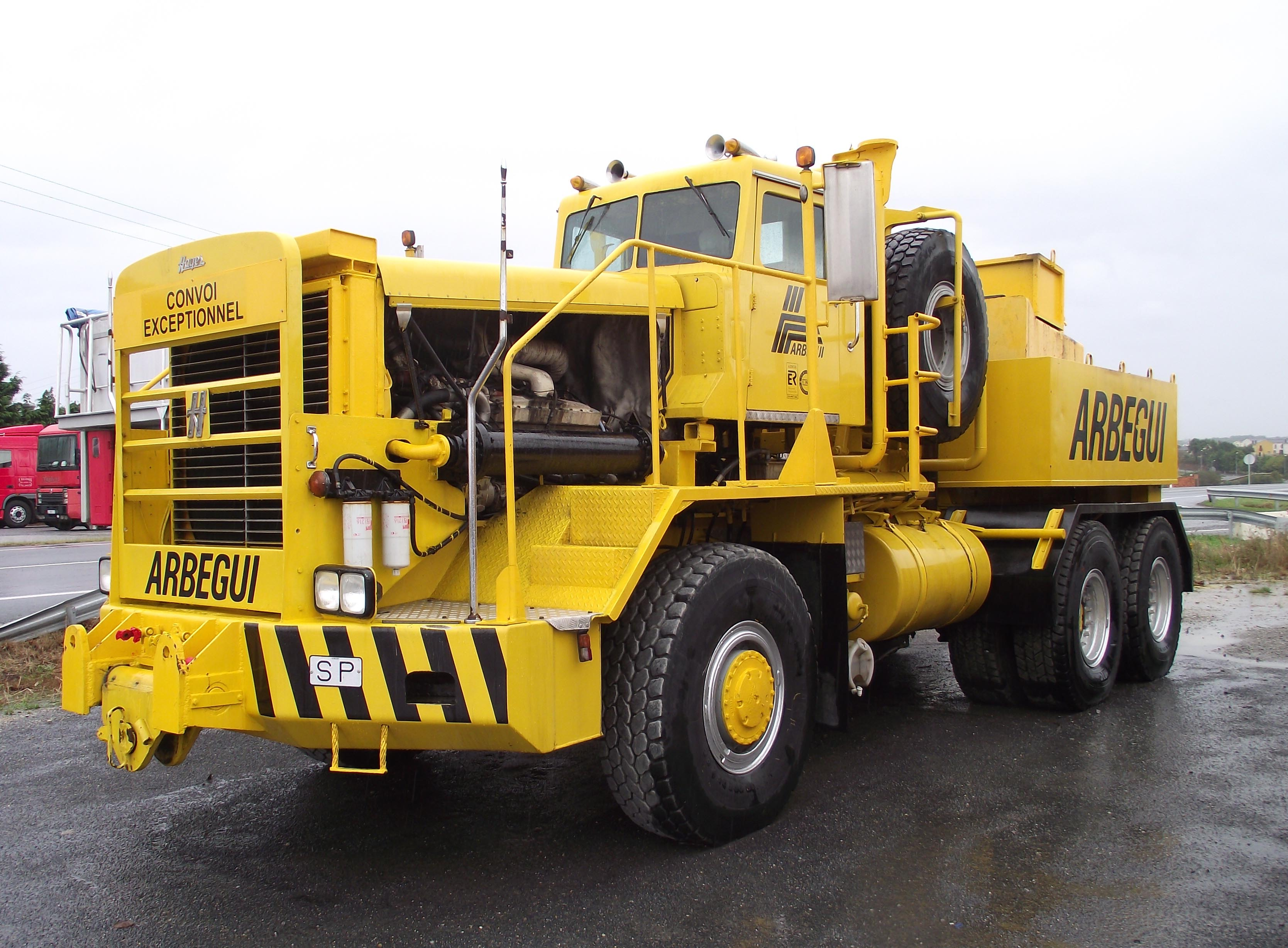
- A Hayes WHDX 70-170 ballast tractor 6×6 truck operating in Spain in 2010.
- Formerly: Hayes-Anderson Motor Company Ltd.
- Type: Public (1920–1974); Subsidiary (1975)
- Industry: Truck manufacturing
- Founded: 1920; 106 years ago in Vancouver, British Columbia
- Founder: Douglas Hayes; W. E. Anderson
- Defunct: 1975
- Fate: Dissolved by Paccar
- Headquarters: Vancouver, British Columbia, Canada
- Parent: Paccar

The Hayes Manufacturing Company, also known as Hayes, was a Canadian manufacturer specializing in heavy equipment vehicles. Founded in 1928 as Hayes-Anderson, Hayes developed custom trucks and off-road vehicles and expanded with the local forestry industry in Vancouver. Before World War II, Hayes had diversified into streamliner buses, while afterwards they expanded into on-highway semi-trailer trucks. In 1969, Mack Trucks acquired a majority stake in Hayes before ultimately being sold off to Paccar five years later. Hayes ceased operations in 1975.

== History ==
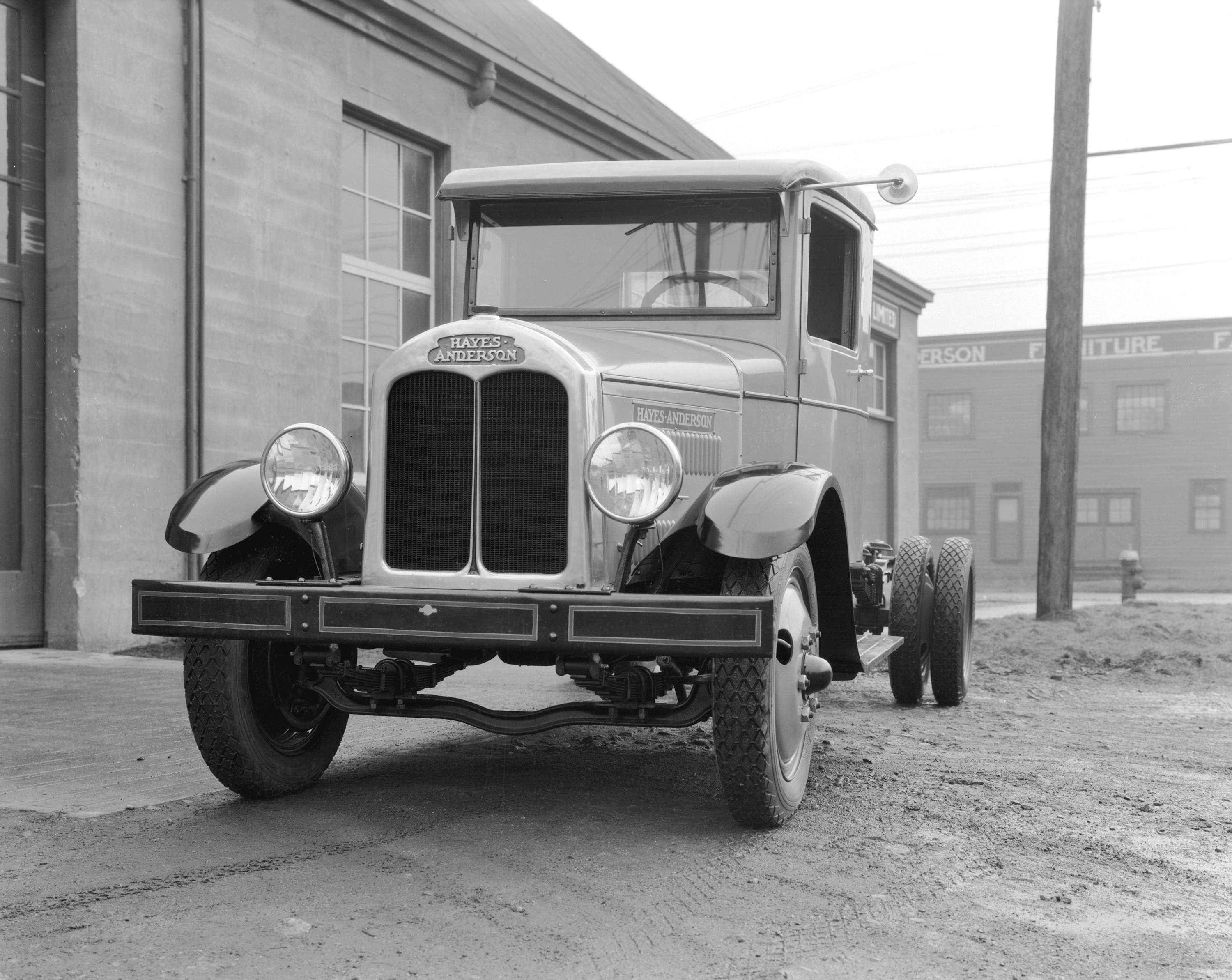
A Hayes-Anderson truck from 1933

The Hayes Manufacturing Company was established in Vancouver in 1920 by Douglas Hayes, an owner of a parts dealer, and entrepreneur W. E. Anderson from Quadra Island, as Hayes-Anderson Motor Company Ltd. The company sold American-built trucks and truck parts for the first two years, then built their own trucks, which were designed for the climate of the Pacific Northwest, because the American-built trucks weren't strong enough for the heavy loads of the logging industry at the time. The company was renamed Hayes Manufacturing Company Ltd. after Anderson left the company in 1928. That same year, Hayes moved to a new plant, which was located on 2nd Avenue in Vancouver, where the company remained until its disestablishment. In 1933, Hayes added diesel engines and dual axles to their logging trucks; the first truck manufacturing company to do so. Despite Anderson leaving the company, the trucks kept the Hayes-Anderson badging until 1934. When hauling logs had become very popular throughout British Columbia, Hayes started production of over-sized logging trucks and trailers.

Throughout the late 1930s, Hayes was a distributor of British-made Leyland trucks, and the Leyland trucks supplemented Hayes' range of trucks. The company also used Leyland's components for the trucks. Hayes merged with Lawrence Manufacturing, a logging equipment manufacturer, in 1946, and was called Hayes-Lawrence. Three employees – Vic Barclay, Mac Billingsley and Claude Thick – left the management division of Hayes to start Pacific Truck & Trailer Co. in 1947. In the early 1950s, the company started manufacturing a range of on-road trucks. The Signal Company, the parent firm of Mack Trucks, acquired a two-thirds share in Hayes Manufacturing in 1969, and Hayes began a mass expansion; production increased from 50 trucks per year to 500. The company was renamed Hayes Trucks in 1971. The company at its peak in the late 1960s had 600 employees and three plants; all of them were located in Vancouver. In 1975, Signal sold the company to Gearmatic Co., a subsidiary of Paccar, which closed the Hayes plants and stopped production. The Canadian Bank Note Company made 1 million Hayes truck stamps as part of the Historic Land Vehicles series.

== Products ==
Hayes manufactured cab-over and conventional trucks. The company used Detroit Diesel, Cummins, Rolls Royce and Caterpillar engines. Hayes also manufactured buses, moving vans, tractors and trailers. The company's few bus models included the Hayes Teardrop, a streamlined bus introduced in 1936. Several Teardrop buses were purchased by Pacific Stage Lines, one of which has been preserved by the Transit Museum Society.

== See also ==
- Pacific Trucks — Company founded by three former employees.
- Challenger trucks — A company founded in 1987 that rebuilt Hayes trucks.
