= Pacific Trucks =

Defunct Canadian truck manufacturer

Pacific Truck & Trailer Limited
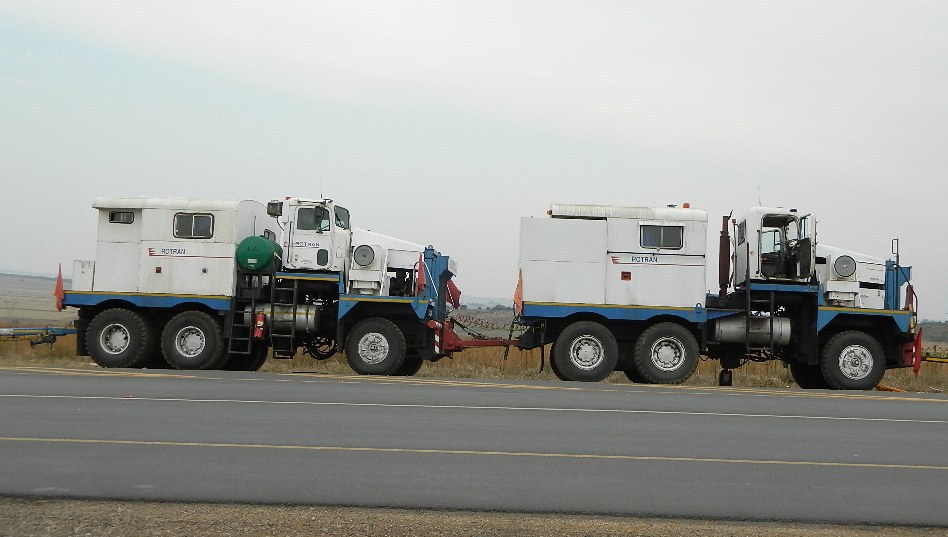
- A Pacific Ballast tractor connected with a draw bar for hauling in a Hydraulic modular trailer configuration in South Africa.
- Industry: Truck manufacturing
- Founded: 1947
- Founder: Vic Barclay; Mac Billingsley; Claude S. Thicke
- Defunct: 1991
- Headquarters: Vancouver, British Columbia, Canada
- Parent: Crane Carrier Canada
- Website: pacifictruck.com

Pacific Truck & Trailer Limited was a Canadian manufacturer specializing in heavy equipment vehicles. Pacific built various kinds of trucks, particularly for the logging industry. The company was founded in 1947. After being bought and sold to multiple companies, Pacific was disestablished in 1991. Its trademark is owned by Coast Powertrain and the company itself is owned by the Canadian division of Crane Carrier Company.

== History ==
In 1947, Vic Barclay, Mac Billingsley and Claude S. Thicke – three former employees of the Hayes Manufacturing Company, which was a truck-building company – established their truck-building shop as Pacific Truck & Trailer Limited, producing heavy-duty logging trucks and trailers for the logging business in Canada. The company was initially based on a shipping wharf at West Coast shipyards in False Creek. In 1948, the company moved to Franklin Street, East Vancouver. Thicke was president of Pacific during the early 1950s. Pacific was critically acclaimed for their hand-built quality and ability to respond to custom requests. For example, in 1953, the company made three custom bunkhouse trailers, which have a full-length of thirty feet (9.1 metres) and weighed forty tons, for the Royal Canadian Engineers, who were in Dawson Creek, British Columbia at the time. In 1967, Pacific Truck & Trailer relocated to the City of North Vancouver. By then, the company had manufactured 350 trucks and numerous trailers and the company's president was J. M. Billingsley. The same year, Newconex Holdings Limited bought a controlling seventy-five percent share in Pacific Truck & Trailer Ltd. In the early 1970s, the business was sold to the Canadian division of International Harvester (IH). The president of Pacific, S. G. DeBou, chose Glenn M. Ferguson and William R. Fleming to be vice-presidents of the company, in 1972. The year after, Pacific's Board of Directors decided to replace DeBou as president of Pacific with Stephen Mostardi, a former IH employee. Mostardi chose George A. Gray to be vice-president and manager of general sales in 1974.

Additionally, Mostardi promoted Harold G. Coleman from office manager to comptroller. Colman previously worked nineteen years for IH before joining Pacific in May 1973 as office manager. IH managed worldwide sales, but left Pacific to be a separate body, which Pacific had control over the design and manufacture of the products; however, some of the Pacific models featured International cabins. On September 20, 1983, IH sold Pacific Truck & Trailer to Inchcape Berhad, which was located in Singapore. During this period, the company still constructed semi trucks and were sending the trucks to North America, Asia, and Africa. From 1980 to 1988, the CEO of Pacific was Karl N. Wahl. In October 1991, the last Pacific truck was built and the manufacturing plant was closed and torn down as worldwide need for logging trucks decreased, with only the parts department left in operation in Vancouver. In 1994, the remnants of the company were sold to Crane Carrier Company of Tulsa, Oklahoma, United States. In the summer of 1995, the Vancouver depot built the last Pacific Truck in the back of their parts warehouse. A hand-built 100 ton capacity ore tractor, model P12W3. Crane continued until 2002. After production discontinued, Crane Carrier Company sold the Pacific name, intellectual property, and rights to Coast Powertrain of New Westminster, British Columbia, Canada. Coast Powertrain makes and fixes, parts and sub-assemblies for old Pacific trucks under the name Pacific Truck Manufacturing.

=== Products ===
Pacific Truck & Trailer made logging trucks, construction trucks, offroad trucks and dump trucks utilizing Caterpillar, Cummins and Detroit Diesel engines. The company produced left hand drive and right hand drive trucks.
