= Brown-Lipe-Chapin =

- Company type: Manufacturer
- Industry: Automotive components
- Founded: 1910 in Syracuse, New York, United States
- Founder: Alexander T. Brown, Charles E. Lipe, Winfield Chapin
- Defunct: 1961
- Fate: Merged into Ternstedt Division of General Motors
- Headquarters: Syracuse, New York, United States
- Parent: General Motors

Brown-Lipe-Chapin was a manufacturer of gears, transmissions and differentials based in Syracuse, New York.

Alexander T. Brown and Charles E. Lipe worked together to create several inventions, including the Hy-Lo Bi-Gear for bicycles in 1894, and started the Brown-Lipe Gear Company in 1895. The gear found favor with automobile manufacturers and after Lipe's death (also in 1895) his brother Willard joined Brown and the company started making three-speed transmissions for Ford Motor Company, Franklin, Yellow Cab Company, the Elmore Manufacturing Company, and Garford Motor Truck Company. The Brown-Lipe Gear Company was sold to William Schall & Company on 12 December 1928 for $3.4 million.

In 1910 Charles Mott of General Motors (GM) contracted the Brown-Lipe Gear Company to make a new type of beveled gear differential. Since this would require more money and space than they currently possessed, Brown and Lipe teamed up with Winfield Chapin to form Brown-Lipe-Chapin (BLC). The new company built a five-story building and employed almost 5,000 workers manufacturing differentials, transmissions, and clutch assemblies. BLC was awarded a government contract during World War I to produce rear differentials for 17,000 military vehicles. Several companies, including Chevrolet & International Harvester, used BLC transmissions, as did the Moon Motor Car company. General Motors attempted to acquire BLC in 1917 but was unsuccessful. In 1923 General Motors tried again, succeeding this time, and BLC was added to the company's divisions. In 1929 a $250,000 order was placed by the Soviet Union for Hercules Engine Company and BLC transmissions. The BLC plant was closed in 1933 (converted into an industrial plant for several small businesses) but the division continued to exist at another location, working with GM's Guide Lamp Division on 13 January 1936 to produce headlamps, hub caps, and bumpers.

Now employing approximately 1,700 workers, BLC expanded production that same year to include steering gears and emblems. An upturn for the division came on 14 September 1940, when they were awarded a government contract to produce .30 caliber M1919 Browning machine gun barrels. By September 1941 the division had expanded, taking up an entire floor to manufacture machine guns, with a test firing range set up on the roof of the building. In addition to the .30 Browning MG, BLC started producing .50 caliber M2 Browning machine guns in March 1943. BLC produced a total of 95,419 .30 caliber Brownings and 119,789 .50 caliber Brownings. A book about BLC's contribution to the war, titled Brown-Lipe Chapin Division General Motors Corporation Goes to War, was published in 1944.

In July 1945 BLC restarted production of automobile parts and in 1951 a new plant was created to manufacture parts for the Wright J65 jet engine. The old plant continued to produce chrome parts until being sold to Porter-Cable. December 1961 saw the BLC division merged into the Ternstedt Division, which produced automotive body parts.

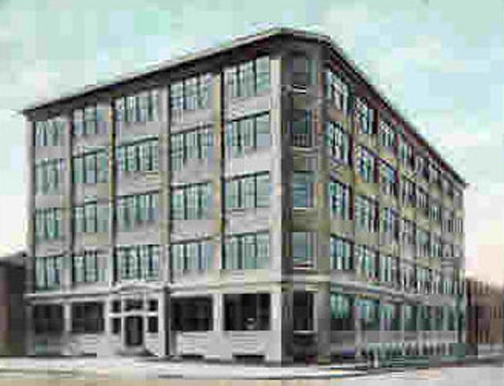
Brown-lipe-chapin 1900

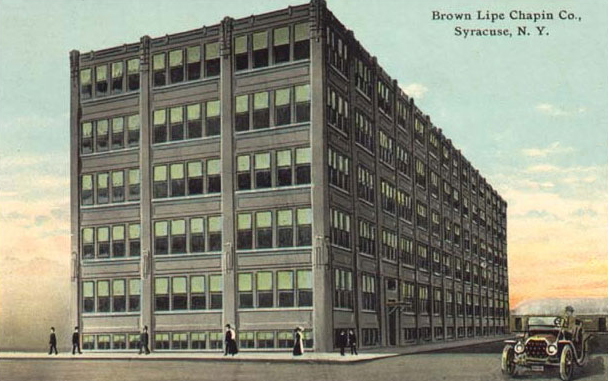
Brown-lipe-chapin 1910

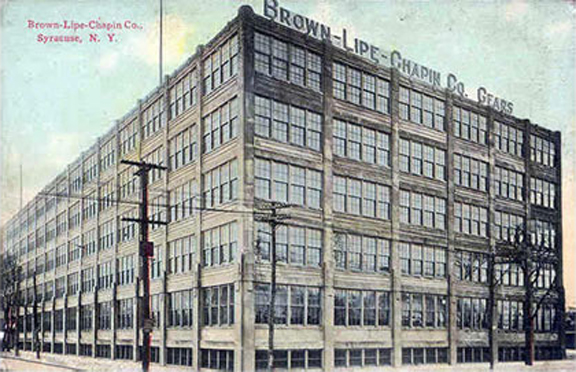
Brown-lipe-chapin 1910 factory-seneca-st

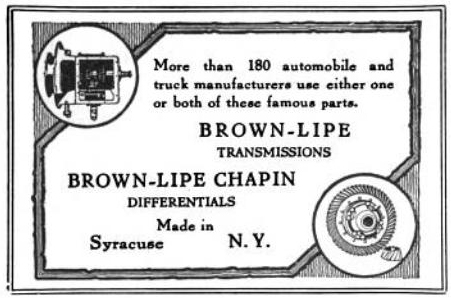
Brown-lipe-chapin 1917-10-04

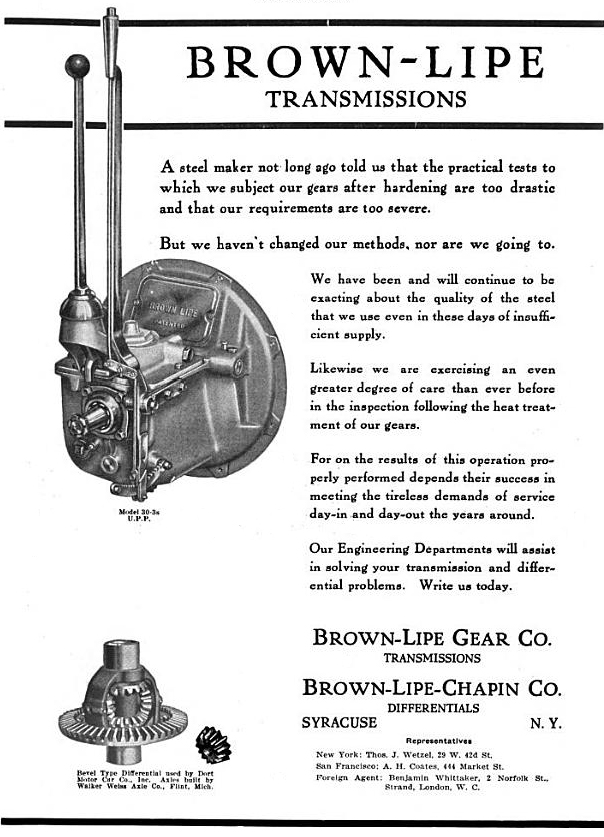
Brown-lipe transmissions 1917
