= 1919 Motor Transport Corps convoy =

US Army transcontinental expedition evaluating the state of America's roads

External media

Images
- Eisenhower Library gallery
- June 28 DC parade
- Travelmobile kitchen @ Camp Meigs
- near Boone, Iowa
- winching Militor in Nebraska (page 21)
- east Wyoming
- mascot puppy in SLC
- SF parade at Aunt Jemima billboard
- San Francisco parade
- cooking w/ 4-wheel trailer
- parade in city
- Westgard motor trails map

Video
- Signal Corps silent footage
- narrated Rawlins photos

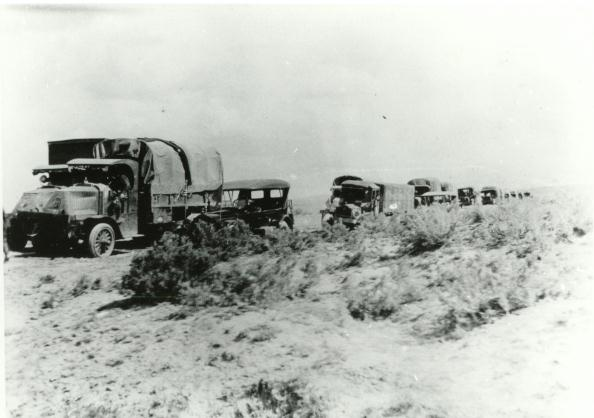
1919 "Trans-Continental Motor Truck"

The 1919 Motor Transport Corps convoy was a long distance convoy (described as a Motor Truck Trip with a "Truck Train") carried out by the U.S. Army Motor Transport Corps that drove over 3,000 mi (4,800 km) on the historic Lincoln Highway from Washington, D.C., to Oakland, California and then was ferried across the San Francisco Bay, ending their journey in San Francisco.

Lieutenant Colonel Charles W. McClure and Captain Bernard H. McMahon were the respective expedition and train commanders and civilian Henry C. Ostermann of the Lincoln Highway Association was the pilot (guide). Official observers included those from the Air Service, A.S.A.P., Coast and Field Artillery, Medical Corps, Ordnance, Signal Corps and Tank Corps including the then Brevet Lieutenant Colonel Dwight D. Eisenhower. Eisenhower later said he joined the convoy "partly for a lark, and partly to learn."

== Organization ==
The Signal Corps filmed convoy events; and the civilians of the Goodyear band were transported from Chicago in one of the trucks. The Publicity Officer (Lt William B Doron) rode with Ostermann 2–10 days ahead of the main body, while the Recruiting Officer (Captain Murphy) was 1–2 days ahead, and the Cook and Mess units were several hours ahead, Two motorcycles scouted about 1/2 hour ahead to report conditions and place markers. The 5th Engineers' Company E of 2 officers and 20 men headed the main body with the artillery's 5 1/2 ton Mack truck carrying a 5-ton Maxwell tractor (22,450 lbs total) in the lead followed by the machine shop and blacksmith shop trucks, and the Quartermaster Corps' Service Park Unit 595 of 1 officer and 43 men brought up the rear ("often separated from the main body" while servicing disabled vehicles). In addition to 230 road incidents (stops for adjustments, extrications, breakdowns and accidents) resulting in 9 vehicles retiring, the convoy of "24 expeditionary officers, 15 War Department staff observation officers, and 258 enlisted men" had 21 injured en route who did not complete the trip. Although some "were really competent drivers" by the end, the majority of soldiers were "raw recruits with little or no military training"; and except for the Motor Supply Company E commander (1st Lt Daniel H. Martin), troop officers had "meager knowledge" of "handling men in the field."

== Equipment ==
In addition to engineer and quartermaster units; the convoy had 2 truck companies of the 433rd Motor Supply Train; a medical unit with surgeon, medical, and dental officers; and a Field Artillery Detachment which provided the Maxwell crawler tractor operated by a civilian. The 81 total vehicles and trailers included "34 heavy cargo trucks, 4 light delivery trucks", 2 mobile machine shops, 1 blacksmith shop, and 1 wrecking truck, actually a Militor "Artillery Wheeled Tractor" that once towed 9 trucks at once and was equipped with a power winch. There were "2 spare parts stores, 2 water tanks, 1 gasoline tank, 1 searchlight with electrical power plant truck, 4 kitchen trailers, 8 touring cars, 1 reconnaissance car, 2 staff observation cars, 5 sidecar motorcycles, and 4 solo motorcycles"; as well as five GMC ambulances with two ambulance trailers, and a Loder 4-ton pontoon trailer (left in Omaha). Additional vehicle manufacturers included Cadillac, Dodge, F.W.D., Garford, Harley-Davidson and Indian (motorcycles), Liberty (trucks and a 2-wheel kitchen cart), Mack, Packard, Riker, Standardized, Trailmobile (two 4-wheel kitchen trailers), and White. The heavy trucks included three examples of each of three wartime commercial models in the 3 to 5-1/2 ton range being considered for continued service (FWD, Mack and Riker) along with eleven 1-1/2 ton trucks from Garford, GMC, Packard and White. The four "light delivery trucks" were 3/4 ton Dodges and the remainder were 3 ton Class B Standardized Military "Liberty" trucks. Dealers en route supplied gasoline and tires to the convoy and the Firestone Tire and Rubber Company provided 2 trucks (Packard & White, each 2-ton) fitted with "giant cord pneumatic" tires that carried spare standard tires. One Firestone truck detoured to Reno, Nevada, to have a new giant tire mounted. Six vehicles were chosen to evaluate Dixon's Graphite Grease to see if it provided worthwhile benefits.

== Operations ==
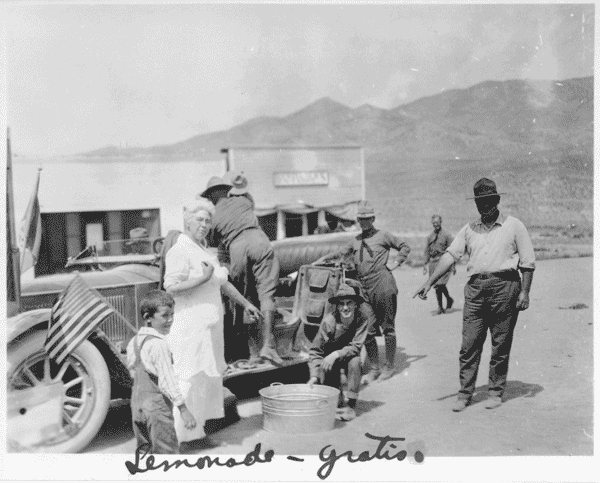
1919 Motor Transport Corps convoy car at a service station in a western desert town.

In the course of its journey, the convoy broke and repaired dozens of wooden bridges (14 in Wyoming alone) and "practically" all roadways were unpaved from Illinois through Nevada. Dust was a constant problem. The convoy travelled up to 32 mph (51 km/h), and the schedule was for 18 mph (29 km/h) to average 15 mph (24 km/h). The actual average for the 3,250 mi (5,230 km) covered in 573.5 hours was 5.65 mph (9.09 km/h) over the 56 travel days for an average of 10.24 hours per travel day. Six rest days without convoy travel were at East Palestine, Ohio; Chicago Heights, Illinois; Denison, Iowa; North Platte, Nebraska; Laramie, Wyoming; and Carson City, Nevada. The shortest driving periods between control points were from Council Bluffs, Iowa, to Omaha, Nebraska (2 hrs for 5 mi) and Delphos, Ohio, to Fort Wayne, Indiana (6 hrs for 51 mi), while 4 days had average speeds over 9 mph (14 km/h): E Palestine OH to Wooster OH (9 hr for 83 mi), South Bend IN to Chicago Heights Il (8 3/4 hr for 80 mi), Jefferson IA to Denison IA (7 1/2 hr for 68 mi), and Anderson's Ranch NV to Ely NV (8 hr for 77 mi).

Inexperience caused a great deal of unnecessary delays and breakdowns in the early going. Both Lieutenant Jackson and Lieutenant Colonel Eisenhower described the Motor Transport Corps soldiers as raw and undisciplined though Jackson also reported that they were generally well behaved. The officers and men of the Engineer, Medical and Ordinance (maintenance) detachments were described as more experienced and better trained. Both Eisenhower and Jackson reported that organization and discipline improved over the course of the expedition. After a few weeks on the road, the most skilled and responsible men were assigned as drivers or co-drivers of specific vehicles with full responsibility for their operations and maintenance. A preventive maintenance routine of evening servicing and morning inspections was instituted to reduce preventable breakdowns. Eisenhower reported that the experience gained on the relatively good roads in the earlier, easier part of the trip proved invaluable in the heavier going further west. Lieutenant Jackson reported that the assignment of a dedicated mess officer in Nebraska greatly improved the food for the second half of the journey.

The convoy was preceded by a publicity officer travelling one day ahead by automobile to prepare for the arrival of the main body. Two junior officers scouted ahead of the main body on motorcycles, signaling the route to the rest of the convoy using a simple but effective system of blue paper triangles tacked to trees and fences. The other motorcycles were used to carry messages up and down the length of the convoy. The Engineer detachment led the main body with the 5-1/2 ton Mack that carried the Artillery detachment's Maxwell crawler tractor. As the largest and most heavily laden vehicle, it was most likely to get stuck, and the crawler and the engineers would be readily at hand to extract it. The engineers were responsible for inspecting each bridge as the convoy came to it. Weak bridges were reinforced or repaired, sometimes after a truck fell through them. Bridges too small or weak for the Mack had to be bypassed. The Ordnance detachment brought up the rear, repairing or towing disabled vehicles as necessary. The trucks generally carried full capacity loads as one of the goals of the expedition was testing their performance.

At many stops along the way, the convoy was escorted into town by local dignitaries and feted with church bells, parades, concerts, picnics, dances and banquets. For example, the log entry for 18 July reads (in part) "At 8:00 A. M. halted by request in Churubusco, Ind for 10 min., while refreshments were served by local Red Cross Canteen Service. Met and escorted through South Bend by Major [sic] F.R. Carson, Chief of Policy [sic] Peter Kline, Fire Chief I.A. Sorbell, Secretary Chamber of Commerce Jos. F. Kelley, Reception Comm. of prominent citizens, 3 Fire Companies and two bands, furnished by the Chamber of Commerce and the Goodrich Company." One pedestrian was struck, non-fatally, in Valparaiso, Indiana. In western Wyoming, Eisenhower and a companion convinced the convoy that an Indian attack was imminent. Sentinels were posted that night, but when Ike and friend exchanged warrior yelps outside the perimeter, a young officer on guard discharged his weapon. They had to stop a telegram being sent to the War Office reporting an encounter with hostile Indians.

=== Delays ===
Convoy delays required extra encampments at Sewickley, Pennsylvania (11/12 July); Gothenburg, Nebraska (2/3 August); and Ogallala, Nebraska (5/6); which delayed arrival at Evanston, Wyoming, to 16 August instead of the scheduled 13 August. To the next control point, the convoy travelled 166 miles (267 km) instead of the planned 88 and used extra camps at Echo, Utah (17/18), and Ogden, Utah (18/19); arriving at Salt Lake City on the 19th (instead of the 14th). Despite travelling on 24 August rest day, the convoy fell behind an additional day using 4 travel days instead of the 2 scheduled travel days from Orr's Ranch, Utah, through the Great Salt Lake Desert to Ely, Nevada; where the convoy arrived on the 24th (v. 18th). An extra travel day on "mining roads" was used between Ely and Austin, Nevada; where the convoy arrived on the 27th (v. 20th), 348 mi (560 km) short of the scheduled point for the 27th (Sacramento). The convoy remained 7 days behind schedule through Oakland, California, where it arrived 5 September at 4 pm (v. the 29th). Forgoing a rest day originally scheduled for the day after arriving in Oakland, the convoy instead ferried to San Francisco the next morning 6 days behind schedule and parked at the Presidio of San Francisco.

== Results ==
In addition to transporting New York's Medal of Joan of Arc for San Francisco's Palace of Fine Arts, the convoy had four objectives; and Ordnance Department and Tank Corps observers completed their reports in October. The objectives were:

1. Encourage "construction of through-route and transcontinental highways." The Ordnance Department notes "great interest in the Good Roads Movement was aroused by the passage of the Convoy."
2. Procure "recruits for ... the Motor Transport Corps": enlistment through the convoy was sparse
3. Exhibit "to the public ... the motor vehicle for military purposes": In the course of the journey, the convoy "passed through 350 communities, and it was estimated that more than 3,000,000 people (perhaps 3,250,000) witnessed it along the route."
4. Study and observe "the terrain and standard army vehicles":. The Tank Corps Observer noted that "the light truck is so far superior to the heavy [which] should be confined to ... hard surfaced roads; and ... short hauls."

Lieutenant Colonel Eisenhower went on note that the variety of vehicles made it difficult to keep the convoy together and none of the vehicles had been properly tested or adjusted before starting out, which along with the raw nature of the troops caused a lot of unnecessary stops and breakdowns. He noted that the convoy commander was not given time to train his men and recommended that "...the M.T.C. should pay more attention to disciplinary drills for officers and men, and that all should be intelligent, snappy soldiers before giving them the responsibility of operating trucks." Eisenhower also dedicated much of his report to a detailed summary of road conditions in each of the states that the convoy traversed, followed by general observations on proper road construction and maintenance, observing that some of the good roads were too narrow and some formerly excellent roads had been allowed to deteriorate without maintenance, stating "In such cases it seems evident that a very small amount of money spent at the proper time would have kept the road in good condition."

Lieutenant Jackson, the Ordnance Department Observer, submitted a detailed report on the performance of all of the convoy's vehicles. The Cadillac and Dodge passenger cars and light trucks were found to be generally satisfactory, though the hood latches on the Dodge proved insufficiently durable. Of the transport trucks, the FWD proved the most satisfactory and the Garford the least, the former due to its mechanical reliability and all wheel drive and the latter due to a fragile cooling system, though the Standard B "Liberty" trucks were actually the most towed trucks in the convoy. The White, GMC, Riker, Packard and Mack trucks also proved satisfactory, though the latter's chain drive rendered them unsuitable for poor roads, and the larger motorcycles would have benefitted from more robust tires. Most of the failures that were not caused by operator error (primarily poor lubrication and over-revving on downgrades) were due to the effects of the constant dust, vibration and pounding on the carburetors, ignition systems, bushings, fasteners and bearings. The various trailers were also evaluated (most received failing grades) and the graphite grease was determined to provide significant benefits. Finally, the Maxwell and Militor tractors were praised for their overall reliability and mechanical superiority, as the trip could not have been completed without them. Lieutenant Jackson also noted "The maintenance work was considerably hampered by the necessity of carrying spare parts for so many different makes of trucks", more thought should have been given to the selection of spare parts and "better tools should be furnished to the mechanics."
