= Militor truck =

U.S. military truck used after World War I

3-ton truck Ordnance Department Model 1918
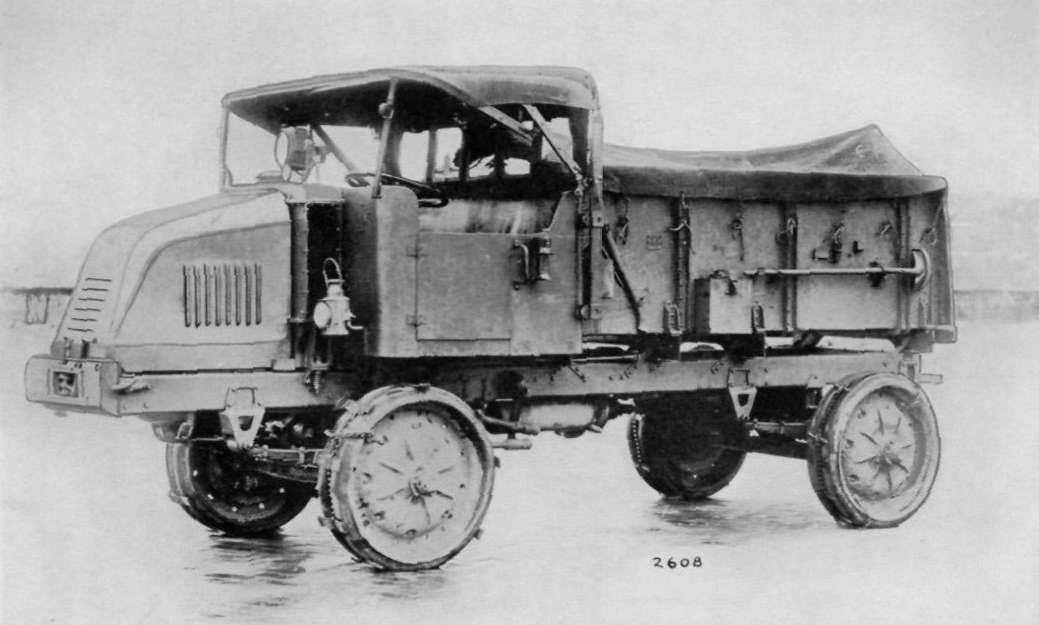
- Militor 3-ton truck
- Type: 3-ton (2,722 kg) 4x4 truck and artillery tractor
- Place of origin: United States

Service history
- In service: 1919–1929
- Used by: United States

Production history
- Designer: Militor Corporation
- Designed: 1917-1918
- Manufacturer: Militor Corporation, Winther Motor and Truck Company
- Produced: 1918-1921
- No. built: 81
- Variants: tractor (with four-wheel steering, winch, and sprag)

Specifications
- Mass: 10,300 lb (4,700 kg)
- Engine: Wisconsin Model A (4-cyl, 390 cu in (6.4 L)); 36 hp (27 kW)
- Transmission: Merchant & Evans Quartermaster B
- Maximum speed: 15 mph (24 km/h) (up to 25 mph (40 km/h) on roads)

The Militor truck, officially 3-ton truck, Ordnance Department Model 1918, was designed and built by the Militor Corporation for the United States Army Ordnance Department as a standardized four-wheel drive 3-ton truck and artillery tractor toward the end of World War I. With the end of the war, larger orders were cancelled and 75 were built, these being issued to the Artillery Corps.

== Design and development ==
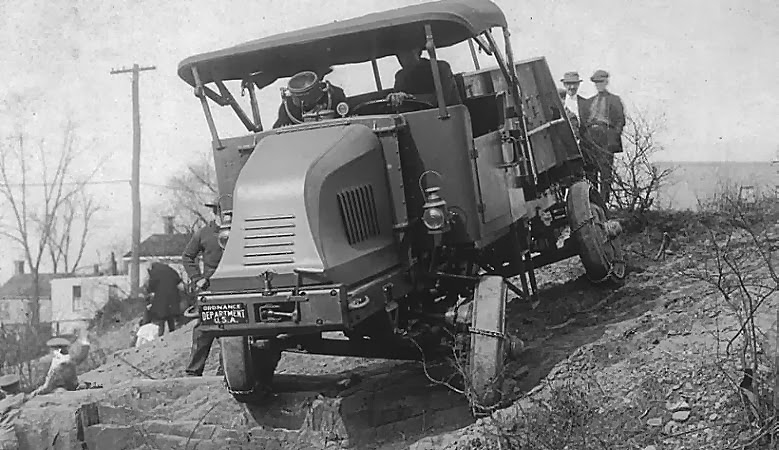
Ordnance Department testing at Hook Mountain, Nyack, New York, August 1918

In November 1917, the Ordnance Department placed an order with the Militor Corporation to design, develop, and build a four-wheel drive vehicle for potential adoption as a standard truck for the Army. Its design and development drew upon experiences with earlier four-wheel drive vehicles: the American Nash and FWD and the French Renault and Latil. As such, the Militor was the first American-built military truck designed in wartime to meet a specific military requirement. Six Militors were built as prototypes in early 1918 for testing by the Army. In late summer 1918, the Army Motor Transport Corps placed an informal order for 1,000 trucks for service in France but that order was cancelled with the end of the war.

== Army evaluation and procurement ==
In May 1919, the Army's Caliber Board (also known as the Westervelt Board after its president, Brigadier General William I. Westervelt), which was composed of representatives of the Field Artillery, Coast Artillery, and Ordnance Department, recommended that the Army adopt the Militor as its standard cross-country vehicle. The Artillery Branch was seeking a vehicle to tow the heavy 155 mm howitzer, which the Army's commercial trucks could not do well. The Board saw the Militor as attractive because of its traction, ruggedness, and high ground clearance. Other organizations within the Army disagreed, however, believing that the Army's existing trucks were adequate for towing artillery. Congress was also reluctant to appropriate funds for new vehicles, also believing that the Army's fleet was sufficient for its purposes. Thus, Secretary of War Newton D. Baker, who was additionally concerned about future Army appropriations, blocked further procurement of the Militor after the order of an additional 75 trucks. That contract was signed in December 1919.

== Service with 1919 Motor Transport Corps convoy ==
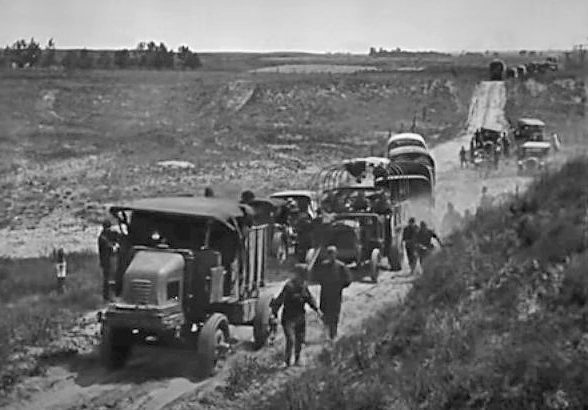
Militor in 1919 convoy (lower left)

One of the prototype Militors served notably in the 1919 Motor Transport Corps convoy, a long-distance convoy of 81 vehicles and trailers carried out by the Army Motor Transport Corps. The convoy drove over 3,000 mi (4,800 km) on the historic Lincoln Highway from Washington, D.C., to Oakland, California and then moved by ferry to end in San Francisco. Convoy vehicles often broke down and became stuck on the then-primitive roads in the western United States and the Militor was frequently used to free them. It was equipped with a power winch and once towed nine trucks at once. Ordnance Department Observer, Lieutenant Elwell Jackson, submitted a report on the performance of all of the convoy's vehicles. He praised the Maxwell and Militor tractors for their overall reliability and mechanical superiority and noted that the trip could not have been completed without them. He called the Militor, "unquestionably the most valuable vehicle in the entire Convoy."

== Service with Army artillery ==
After some delays in procurement caused by financial difficulties at the Militor Motors Corporation and the transfer of the procurement contract to the Winther Motor and Truck Company, the Militors were delivered to the Army in the first half of 1921. Most were sent to Fort Bragg, North Carolina; some others were sent to Fort Sill, Oklahoma. They served with the Army artillery, towing guns and howitzers and other pieces of artillery equipment. In the mid-1920s, the trucks at Fort Bragg were part of the equipment of the 13th Field Artillery Brigade. The Militors were praised for their towing capabilities, conveyed by their low gear ratio (enabling them to tow pieces as large as 240 mm howitzers), and their reliability, although some observers noted design flaws that would require a redesign of the vehicle to remedy. Their performance was good enough in field service that it was recommended in 1924 that they be adopted as the Army's standard four-wheel drive cargo truck. The Office of the Secretary of War declined the recommendation, however, because the Militor was an expensive, specialized design with limited potential as a commercial vehicle and thus it would likely have been difficult to produce rapidly in the event of another major war. In 1925 the Army began to purchase newer and more powerful trucks designed by Coleman for use as its new artillery tractor. By 1928 it was transitioning entirely to commercial artillery tractors. The last Militors were replaced in 1928 and 1929. It is believed that no examples of the Militor survive today.
