= Service Motor Truck Company =

Defunct American motor vehicle manufacturer

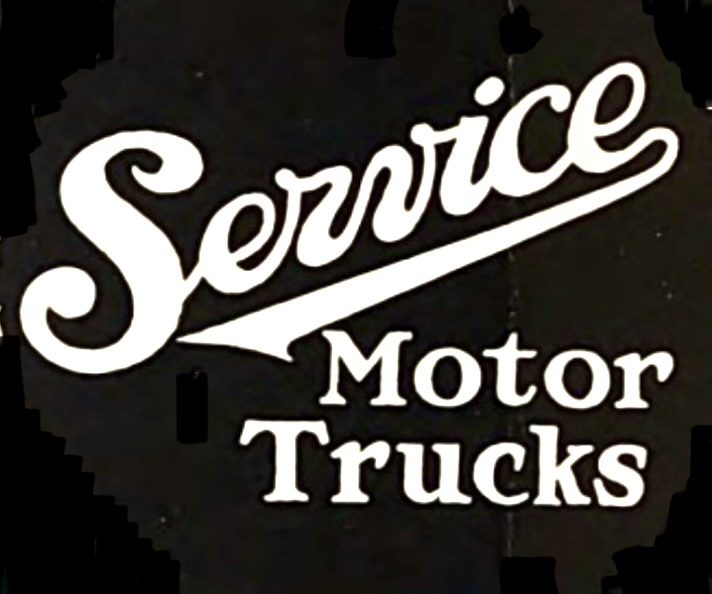
- Formerly: Service Motor Car Company
- Type: Truck Company
- Industry: Manufacturing
- Founded: 1911; 115 years ago
- Defunct: 1926; 100 years ago
- Successor: Relay Motors Corporation
- Headquarters: Wabash, Indiana, US
- Products: Trucks

The Service Motor Truck Company of Wabash, Indiana, was a truck manufacturer.

== History ==
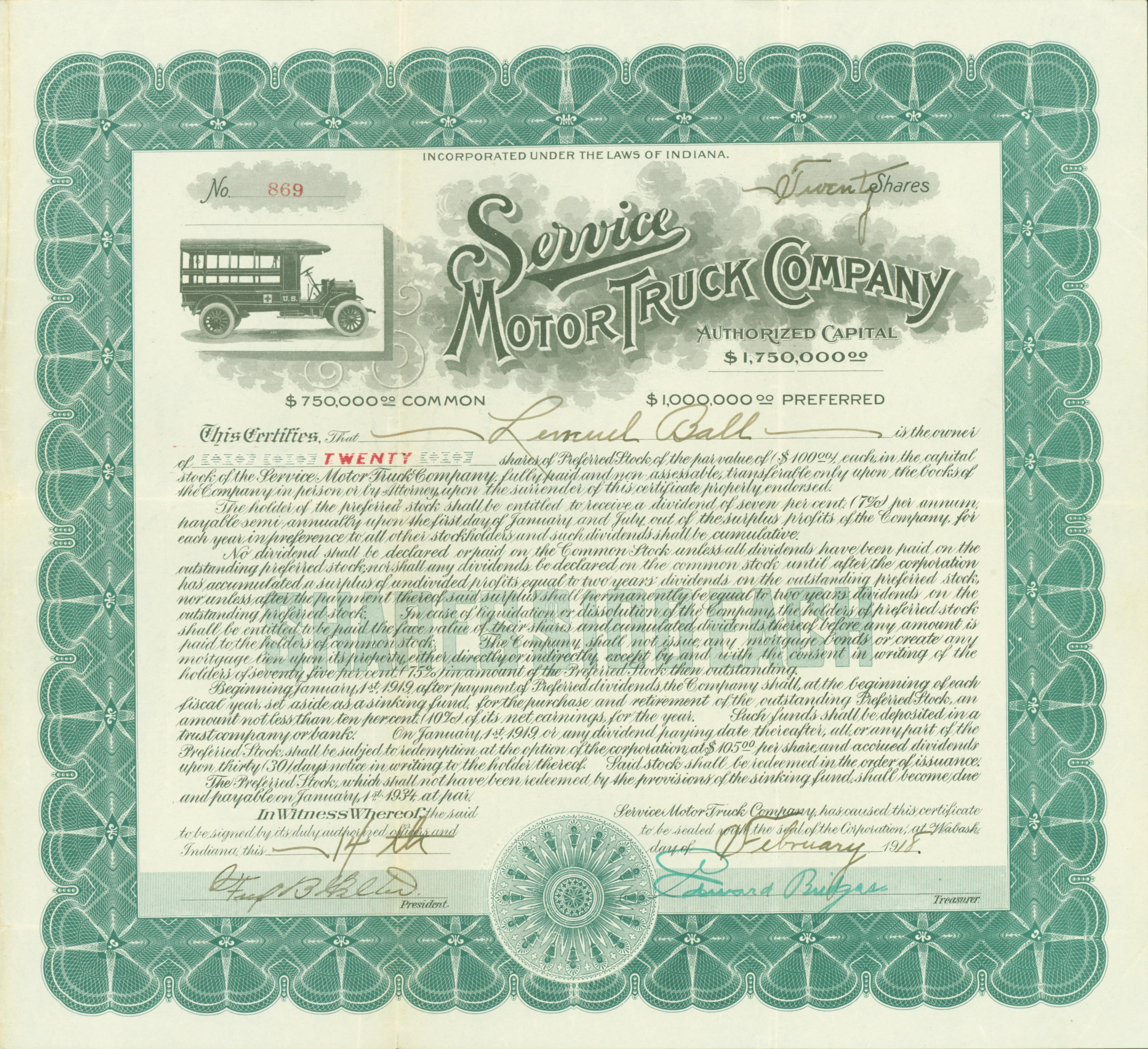
Service Motor Truck Comp. 1918

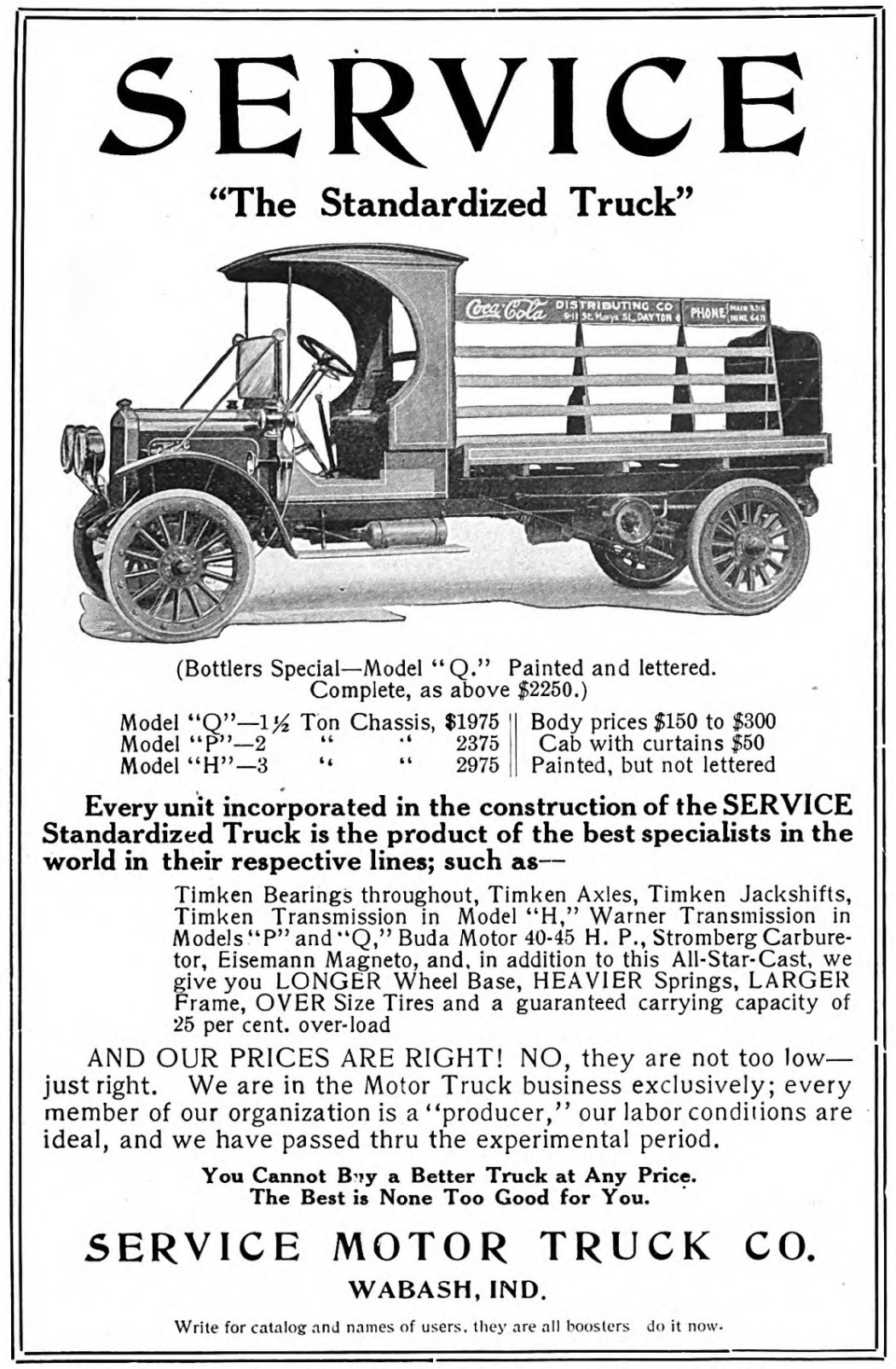
Service advertisement Model Q (1914)

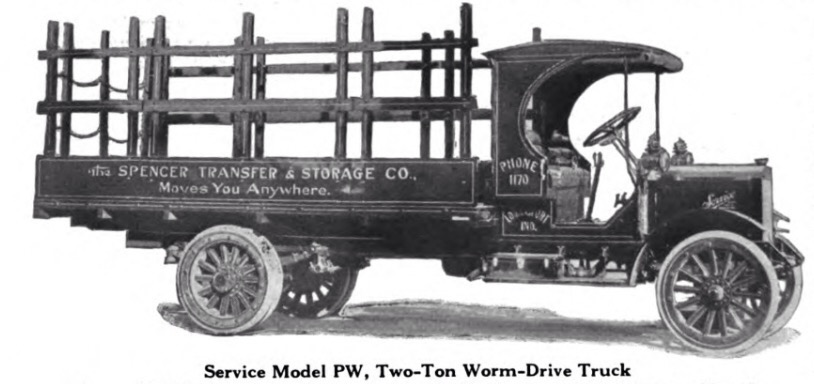
Service Model PW (1915)

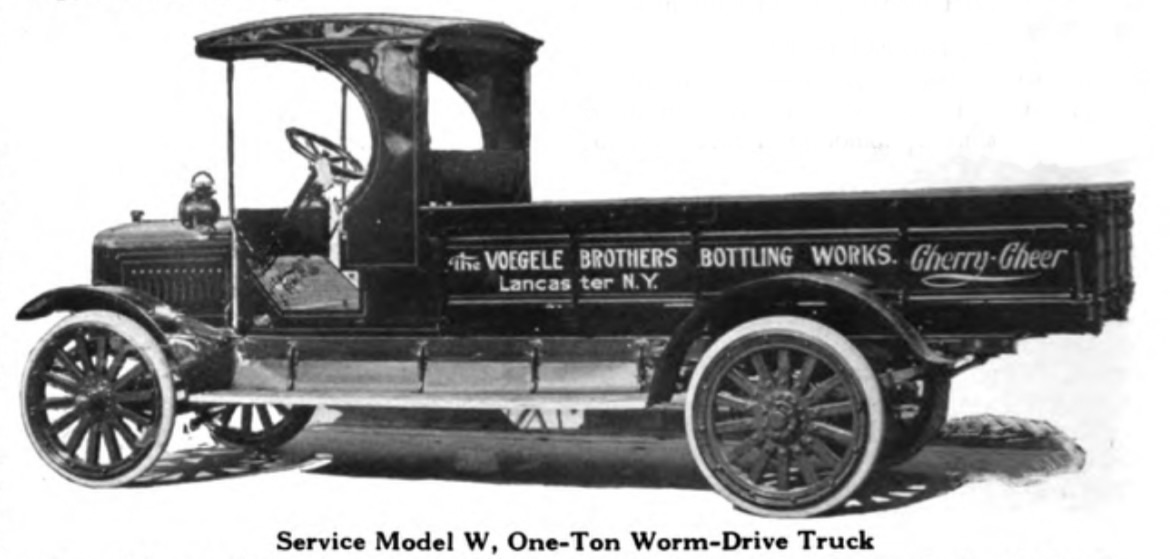
Service Model W (1915)

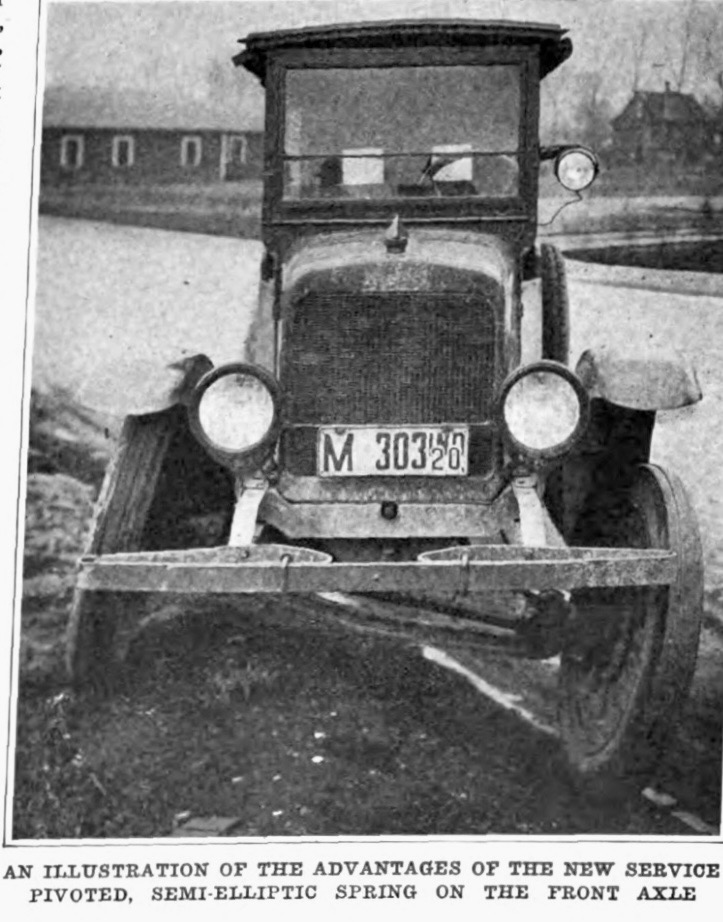
Service Model 15 (1920-1921)

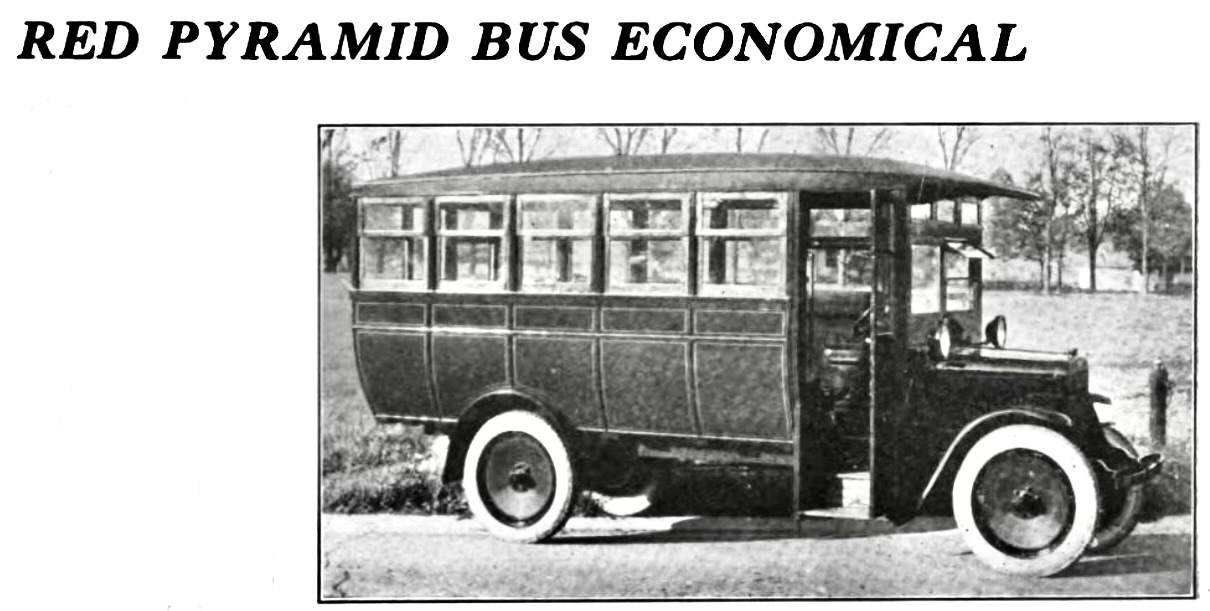
Service Model 5 Red Pyramid bus (1922)

The Service Motor Car Company was founded in 1911 in Chicago. The production plant was located in Kankakee, Illinois. Production of cars and trucks had already started in 1911. The vehicles were sold under the brand name " Service ". The unprofitable car production was discontinued by 1912. In 1912, the company moved to Wabash, Indiana. In 1914, the company changed its name to Service Motor Truck Company, and in 1923, it was renamed again to Service Motors Inc. Service Motor Truck Company built 337 Liberty trucks in 1918. In 1926, Relay Motors Corporation took over the company.

== Production models ==
1911

- Model A

1914

- Model Q (1,5 to) Buda Motor
- Model P (2 to) Buda Motor
- Model H (3 to) Buda Motor

1915

- Model PW (2 to)
- Model W (1 to)

1918

- Model 220 (1 to) Buda Motor
- Model 230 (1,5 to)
- Model 240 (2 to)
- Model 270 (3,5 to)
- Model 275 (3,5 to)
- Model 300 (5 to)
- Liberty truck (3-5 to)

1919

- Model 21 (1 to)
- Model 41 (2,5 to)
- Model 71 (3,5 to)
- Model 76 (3,5 to)
- Model 101 (5 to)

1920

- Model 220 (1 to) Buda Motor
- Model 31 (1,5 to)
- Model 36 (1,5 to)
- Model 51 (2,5 to)
- Model 71 (3,5 to)
- Model 76 (3,5 to)
- Model 101 (5 to)
- Model 15 (0,75-1 to)

1921

- Model 220 (1 to) Buda Motor
- Model 31 (1,5 to)
- Model 36 (1,5 to)
- Model 51 (2,5 to)
- Model 71 (3,5 to)
- Model 76 (3,5 to)
- Model 101 (5 to)
- Model 15 (0,75-1 to)

1922

- Model 12 (0,75 to)
- Model 5 (bus)
- Model 25 (1,25 to)
- Model 21 (1,5 to)
- Model 32 (2 to)
- Model 52 (3 to)
- Model 72 (4 to)
- Model 77 (4 to)
- Model 102 (6 to)

1923

- Model 12 (0,75 to)
- Model 25 (1,25 to)
- Model 21 (1,5 to)
- Model 32 (2 to)
- Model 33 (1,5 to)
- Model 42 (2 to)
- Model 52
- Model 61 (3 to)
- Model 72
- Model 77
- Model 81 (4 to)
- Model 102
- Model 103 (6 to)
