= U.S. Motor Truck Company =

Defunct American motor vehicle manufacturer

- Type: Truck Company
- Industry: Manufacturing
- Founded: 1909; 117 years ago
- Defunct: 1930; 96 years ago
- Headquarters: Cincinnati, Ohio, US
- Products: Trucks

The U.S. Motor Truck Company of Cincinnati, was a truck manufacturer.

== History ==
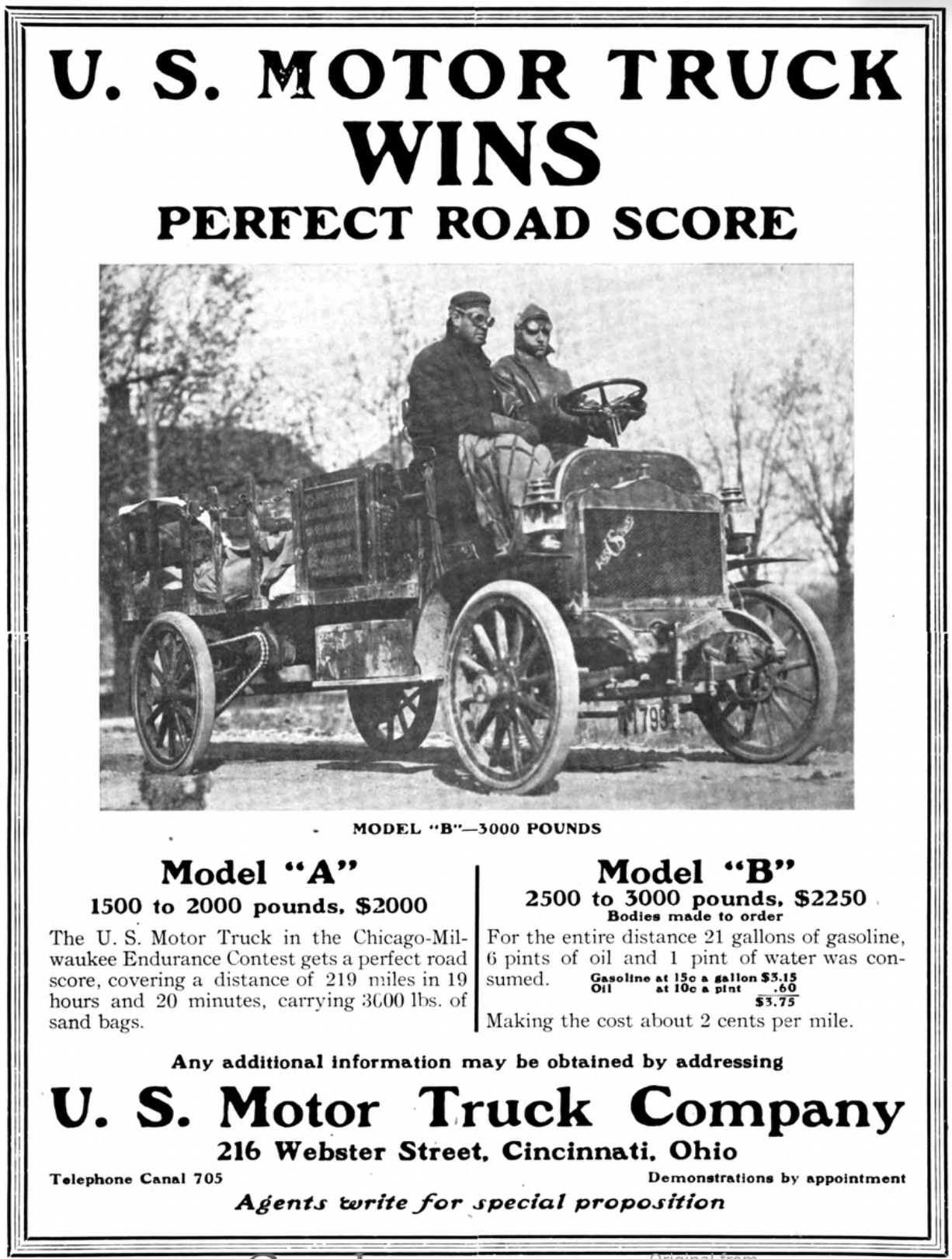
U.S. Motor Truck Company Advertisement (1910)

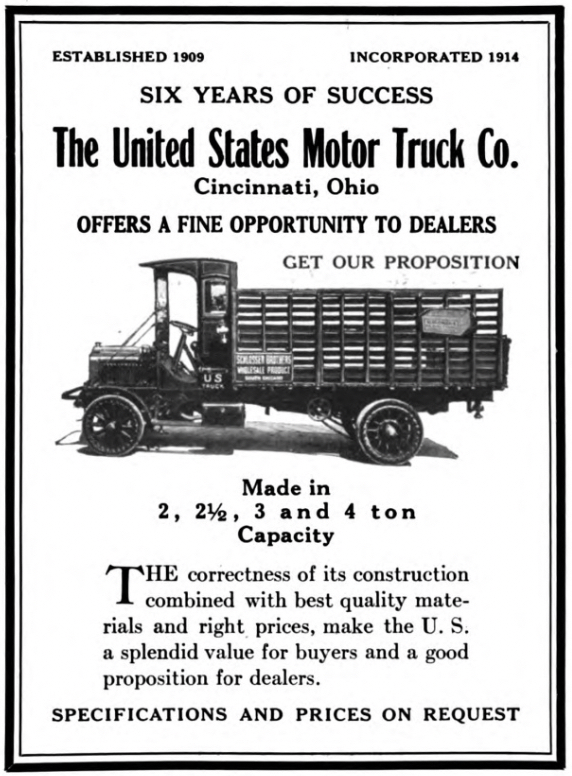
U.S. Motor Truck Company Advertisement (1915)

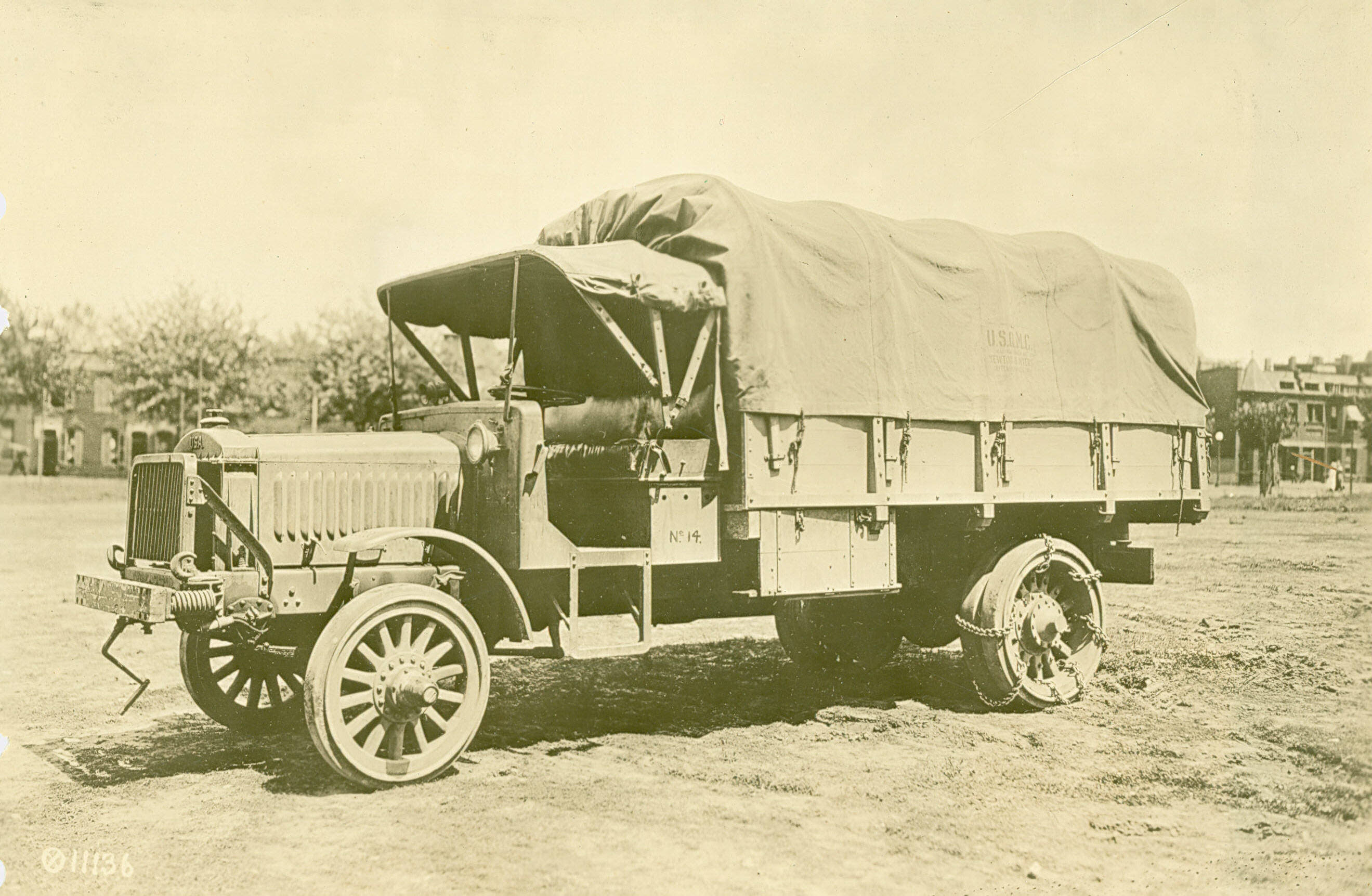
Standardized Liberty truck (1918)

U.S. Motor Truck advertisement (1918)

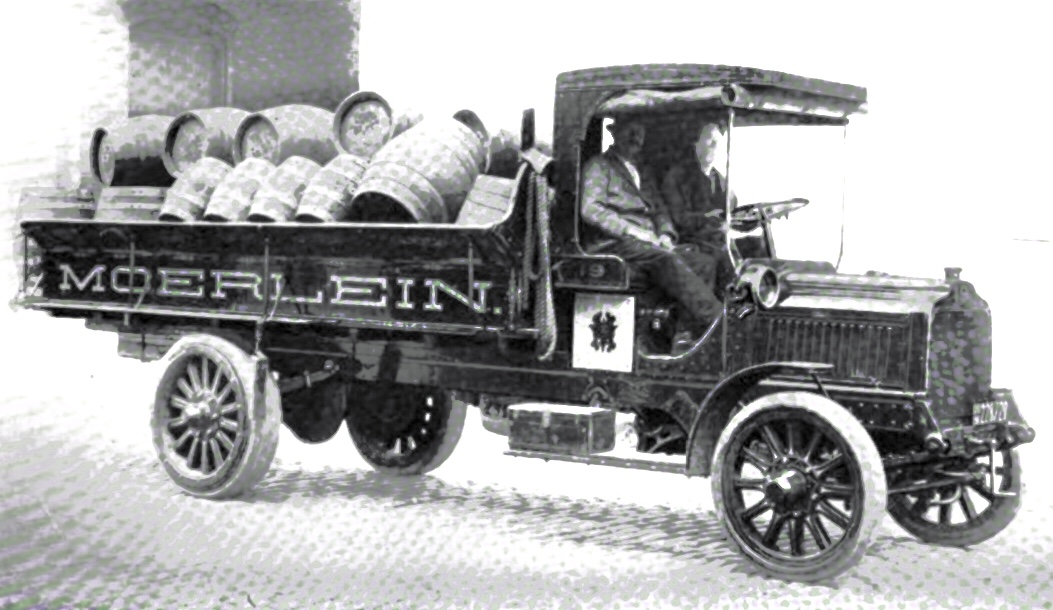
U.S. Motor Truck Model M (1919)

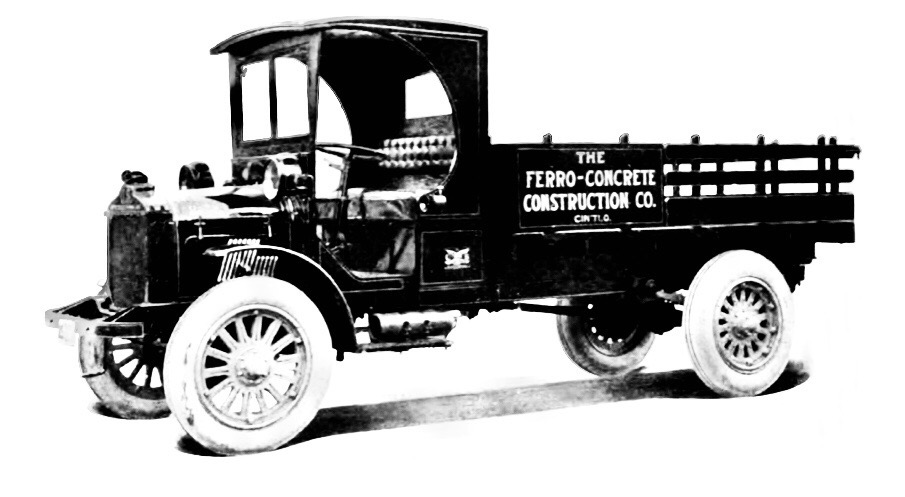
U.S. Motor Truck Model NP (1920)

The U.S. Motor Truck Company started in Cincinnati in 1909. P. D. Sampsell held a leading position at the United States Motor Truck Co. as one of the sales managers for several U.S. states. The factory was located at 216 Webster Street in Cincinnati. In the early years from 1909 to 1911, only the Model A and Model B were available. Both of these trucks had a two-cylinder engine with around 20 horsepower. The Model A had a payload of 2,000 lbs, which is about 0.9 tons. The Model B had a payload of 3,000 lbs, corresponding to 1.36 tons. The selling price of the Model A was 2,000 dollars, and that of the Model B was 2,250 dollars. The engines mostly came from Buda, but also from the Continental Motors Company and Waukesha and Hinckley. Starting in 1917, the Liberty truck program of the U.S. government was launched. The Liberty Army truck was built according to specifications of the U.S. military by numerous commercial vehicle manufacturers, including the U.S. Motor Truck Company. The purpose was to provide the United States, which had just entered World War I, and its allies with as many vehicles as possible as quickly as possible. Ultimately, 490 trucks were provided by the U.S. Motor Truck Company.

In the year 1918, the model program consisted of the following vehicles:

- Model E 2.5 tons with a four-cylinder engine for a price of 2800 dollars.
- Model H 2.5 tons with a four-cylinder engine for a price of 3250 dollars.
- Model D 3.5 tons with a four-cylinder engine for a price of 3500 dollars.
- Model M 3 tons with a four-cylinder engine for a price of 3500 dollars.
- Model J 3.5 tons with a four-cylinder engine for a price of 3950 dollars.
- Model K 5 tons with a four-cylinder engine for a price of 4850 dollars.

In the year 1919, the model program consisted of the following vehicles:

- Model E 2.5 tons with a four-cylinder engine for a price of 2800 dollars.
- Model H 2.5 tons with a four-cylinder engine for a price of 3250 dollars.
- Model D 3.5 tons with a four-cylinder engine for a price of 3500 dollars.
- Model M 3 tons with a four-cylinder engine for a price of 3500 dollars.
- Model J 3.5 tons with a four-cylinder engine for a price of 3950 dollars.
- Model K 5 tons with a four-cylinder engine for a price of 4850 dollars.

Newly added was the Model N, a 1.5-ton for 1995 dollars.

- Model N 1.5 tons with a four-cylinder engine for a price of 1995 dollars.

In the year 1920, the model program consisted of the following vehicles:

- Model R 2,5 tons with a four-cylinder engine for a price of 3850 dollars.

Year	Production	Model	Load capacity
1910		A	1 to
		B	1,25 to
1918		E	2,5 to
		H	2,5 to
		D	3,5 to
		M	3 to
		J	3,5 to
		K	5 to
	490	Liberty Truck B	3-5 to
1919		E	2,5 to
		H	2,5 to
		D	3,5 to
		M	3 to
		J	3,5 to
		K	5 to
		N	1,5 to
1920		N	1,5 to
		NC	2 to
		NW	1,5 to
		NP	2 to
		R	2,5 to
		S	3,5 to
		T	5 - 6 to
1921		N	1,5 to
		NC	2 to
		NW	1,5 to
		NP	2 to
		R	3 to
		S	4 to
		T	6 to
1922		U	1,25 to
		N	1,5 to
		NW	1,5 to
		R	3 to
		S	4 to
		T	5-7 to
1923		U	1,25 to
		N	1,5 to
		NW	2 to
		R	3 to
		S	4-5 to
		T	6 to
