= Bethlehem Motor Truck Corporation =

Defunct American motor vehicle manufacturer

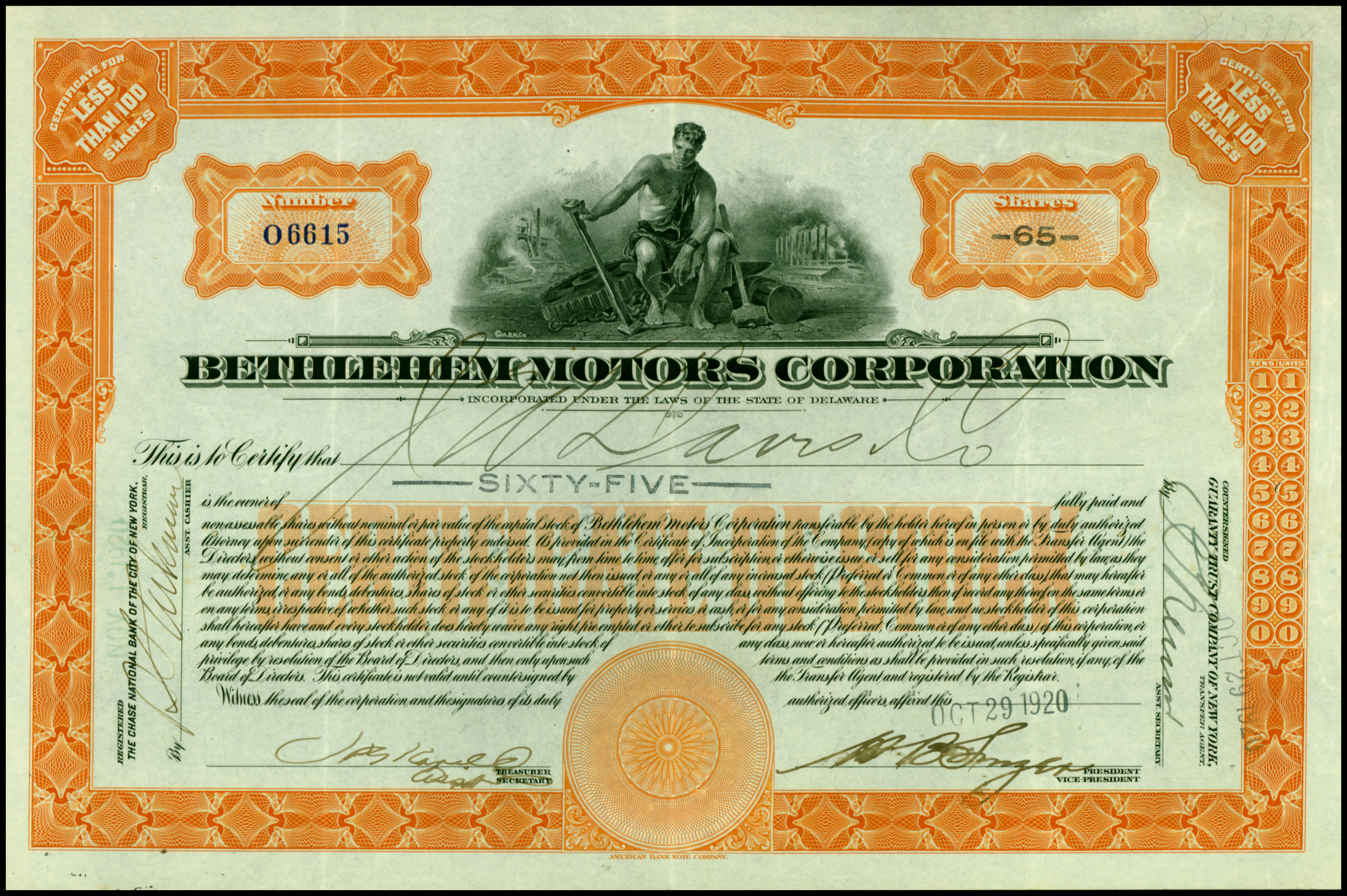
Share of the Bethlehem Motors Corp., issued 29. October 1920

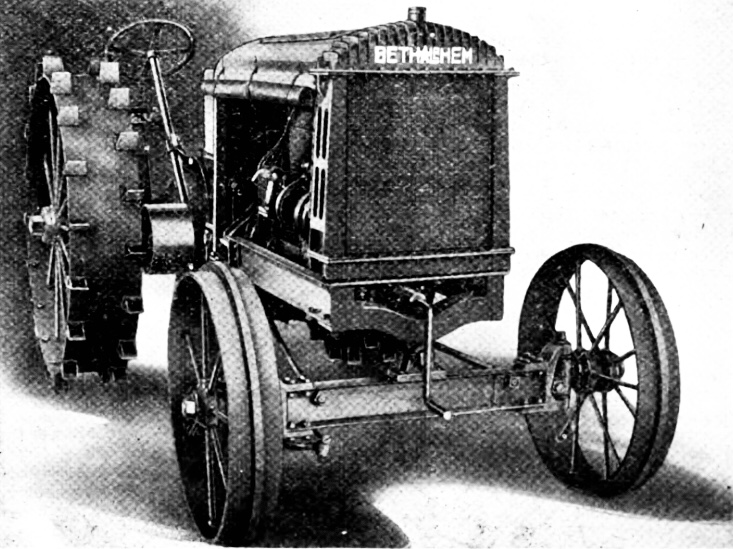
Bethlehem 18-36 (1918-1919)

The Bethlehem Motors Corporation was a manufacturer of tractors, automobiles and trucks in Allentown, Pennsylvania, between 1917 and 1926.

== Tractor manufacturing ==
In 1918 and 1919, the Corporation built the Model 18-36 tractor, which weighed three tons, and was powered by a Beaver 4-cylinder engine with two forward speeds. Standard equipment included a Stromberg carburettor, Bosch magneto and Fedders radiator. The tractor was not a success, probably due to the poor financial position of the company, the crowded tractor market in the United States, and the 1920 agricultural depression.

== Automobile manufacturing ==
In 1920, the Bethlehem Motors Corporation built the 'Ideal' automobile, which was to be sold only outside the United States. The Ideal was a four-seater sedan with a 40 hp engine built by Bethlehem, Timken axles, and was priced at $3,000. The company went into receivership later that year, and all plans to further produce and sell the car were discontinued. New management disposed of the unsold cars for approximately $1,000 each in 1921.

== Truck manufacturing ==
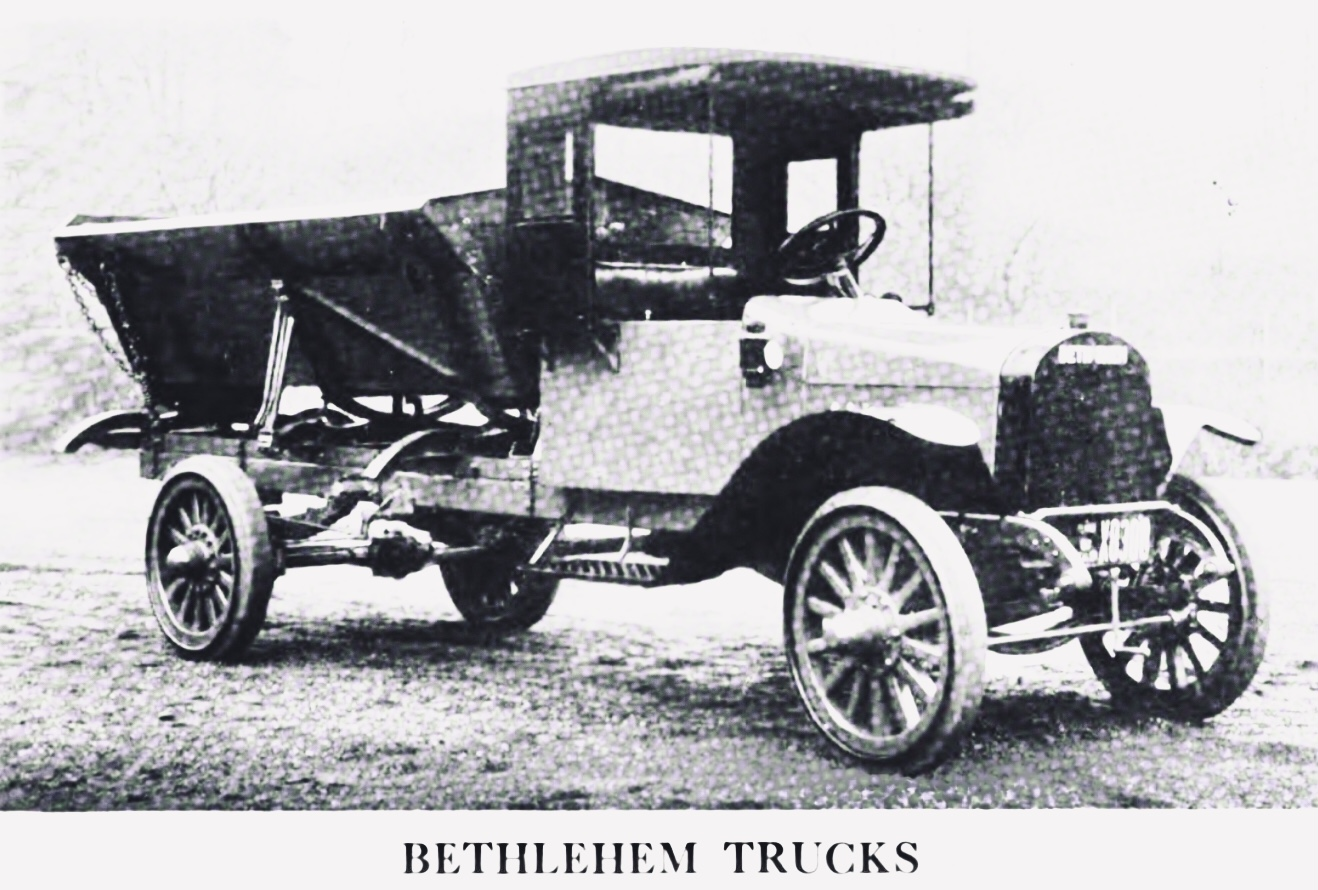
Bethlehem B1 3707 cc (1917-1919)

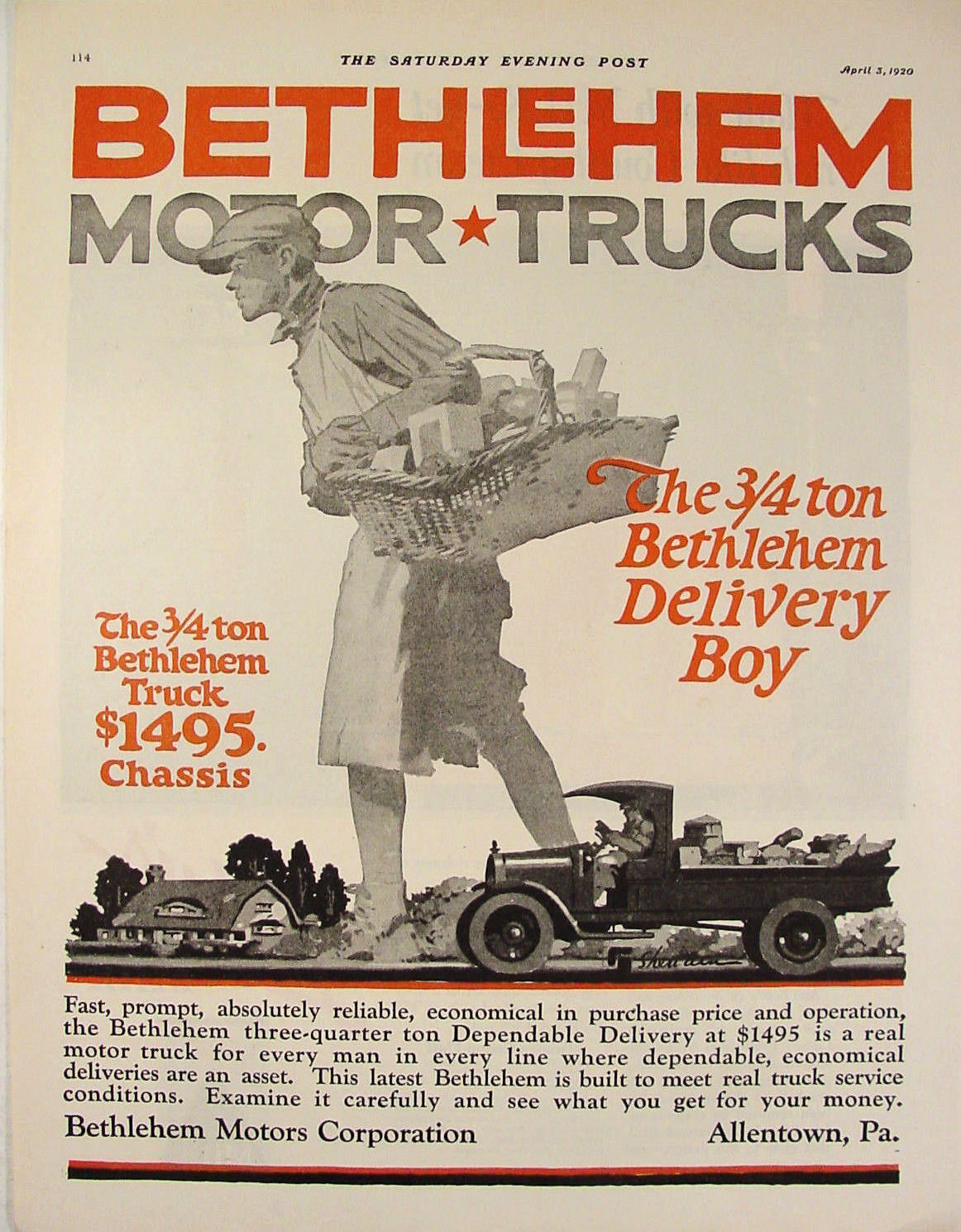
1917 ad for the company's trucks.

Bethlehem advertisement (1918)

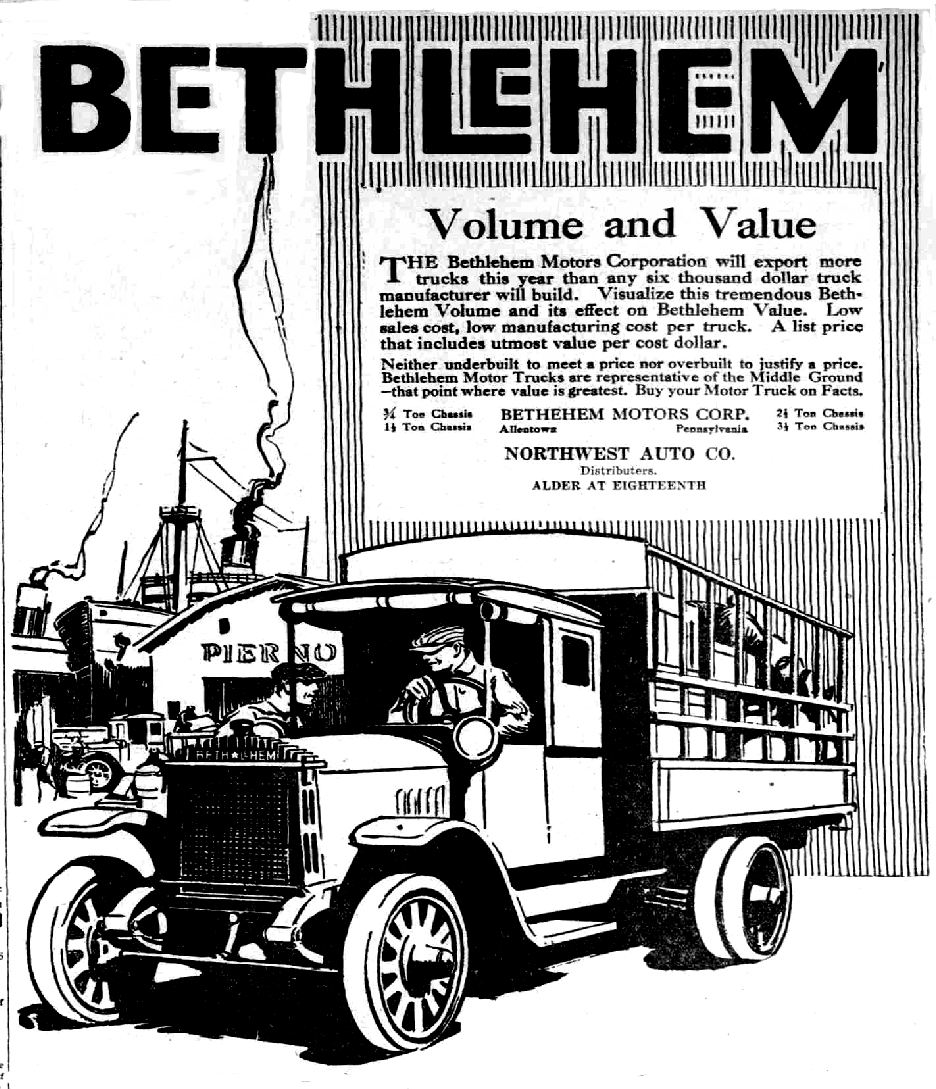
1920 ad for the trucks.

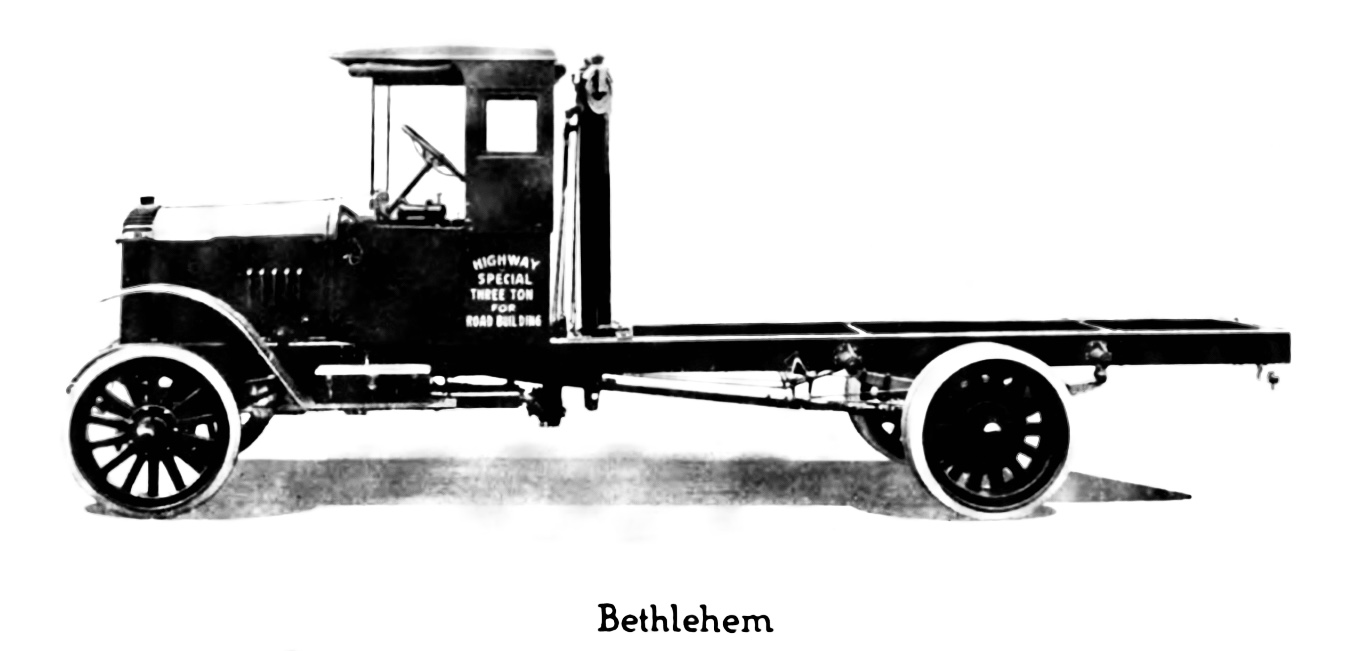
Bethlehem FJ (1919-1920)

Bethlehem advertisement (1925)

Truck manufacture began in 1917, with 1 1/4-ton trucks (Type A1) powered by Golden, Belknap and Swartz engines, and a 2 1/4-ton vehicle (Type B1) using a North American engine. The smaller models cost $1,245; the larger models $1,775. Speeds were between 12 and 18 mph, depending on the engine governor used. Production in 1919 was approximately 3,500. By 1920, all Bethlehem trucks came with electric starter and lights, with the company motto at this time being "Trucks bought today without electric lights will be out of date tomorrow". Despite these new features, business decreased, with the company going into receivership. The last Bethlehem trucks, and the last vehicles of any type manufactured by the Bethlehem Motors Corporation were assembled in 1926. In 1926, Bethlehem merged with the Lehigh Company, a small commercial vehicle manufacturer that produced a truck with a 2-ton payload in Allentown from 1925 to 1927. The factory was bought by Hahn and Company in 1927. Bethlehem was also one of the manufacturers of Liberty Trucks for the United States Army during World War I.

=== Production figures Bethlehem trucks ===
The pre-assigned serial numbers only indicate the maximum possible production quantity.

Year	Production figures	Model	Load capacity	Serial number
1917	~ 1000	A	1,25 to	5000 to 6000
	~ 1000	B	2,25 to	1000 to 2000
1918	~ 1475	D	1,5 to	6500 to 7975
	~ 1350	E	2,5 to	2500 to 3850
	~ 410	F	3,5 to	9000 to 9410
1919	↑	D	1,5 to	↑
	↑	E	2,5 to	↑
	↑	F	3,5 to	↑
1920	~	K	1 to	10000 to ?
	~ 175	D-G	1,5 to	7976 to 8150
	~ 200	E-H	2,5 to	3851 to 4050
	~ 90	F-J	3,5 to	9412 to 9501
1921	~ 3000	G	2 to	15000 to 17999
	~ 3000	H	3 to	18000 to 20999
	~ 3750	K	1 to	10000 to 13750
1922	~ 5000	K-N	1 to	20000 to 24999
	~ 5000	G-N	2 to	25000 to 29999
	~ 5000	H-N	3 to	30000 to 34999
1923		K-N	1 to	35000 to
		G-N	2 to	
		H-N	3 to	
1924		K-N	1 to	
		G-N	2 to	
		L	to	
1925		K-N	1 to	
		G-N	2 to	
		L	3 to	
		M	3,5 to	
Sum				
