= Liberty truck =

US Army heavy-duty military truck

Standard B "Liberty" truck
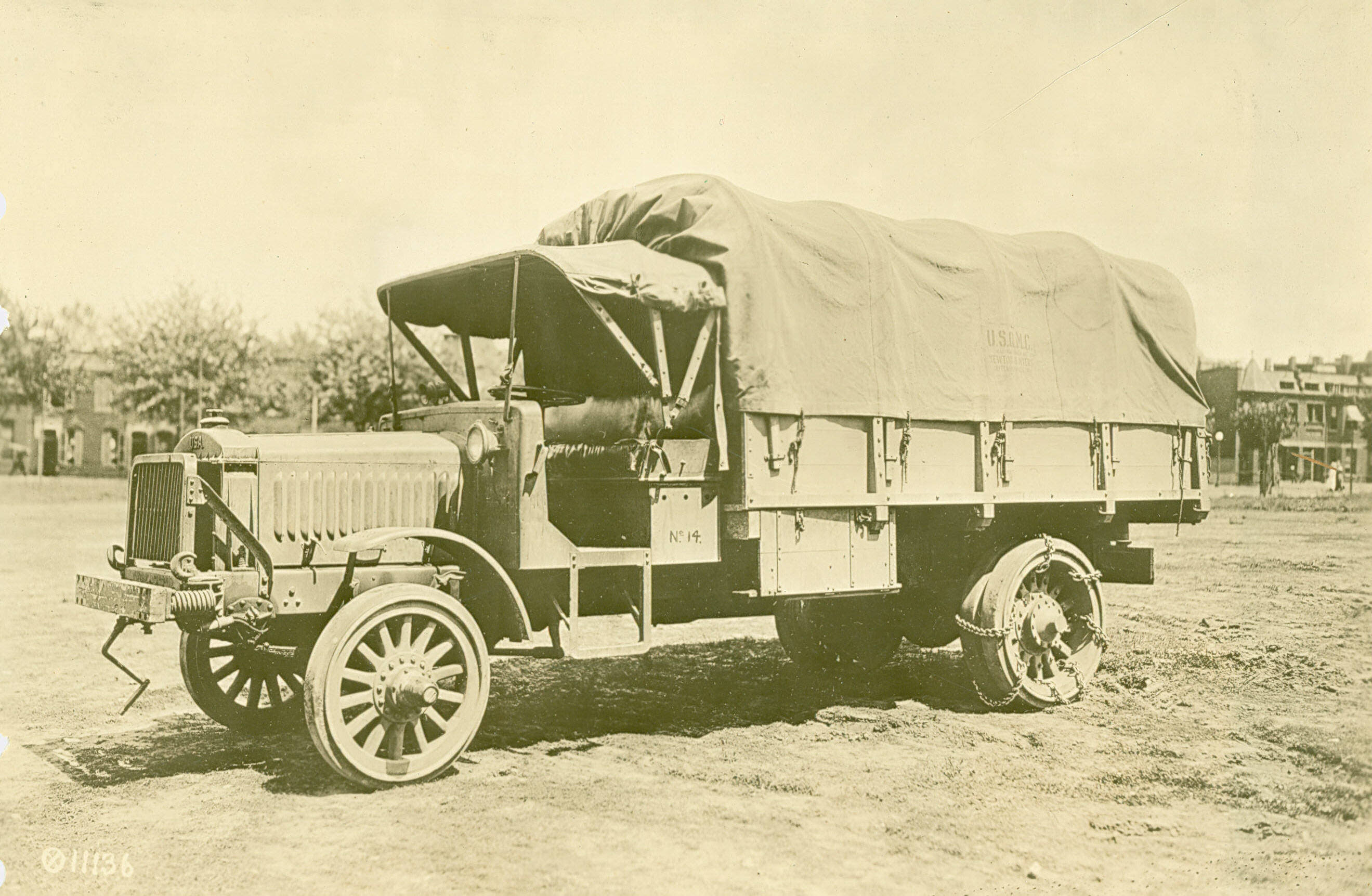

Overview
- Manufacturer: Various (see below)
- Production: 10,000–14,000

Body and chassis
- Class: B 3 to 5 short tons (2.7 to 4.5 long tons; 2.7 to 4.5 t)
- Body style: open cab, Cargo truck

Powertrain
- Engine: Gasoline, 425 cu in (6,960 cc; 6.96 L) L-head, 4-cycle, 52 hp (39 kW),
- Transmission: 4 speed, 4X2,

Dimensions
- Wheelbase: 160.5 in (408 cm)
- Length: 22 ft (671 cm)
- Width: 7.4 ft (226 cm)
- Height: 6.25 ft (191 cm), 10.5 ft (320 cm) with bows and canvas
- Curb weight: 10,400 lb (4,717 kg)

The Class-B Standardized Military Truck or "Liberty Truck" was a heavy-duty truck produced by the United States Army during World War I. It was designed by the Quartermaster Corps with help from the Society of Automotive Engineers in 1917 in an effort to help standardize the immense parts catalogue and multiple types of vehicles then in use by the US military, as well as create a truck which possessed all the best features of heavy truck technology then available. It was the first official standardized motor vehicle adopted and produced by the US Military.

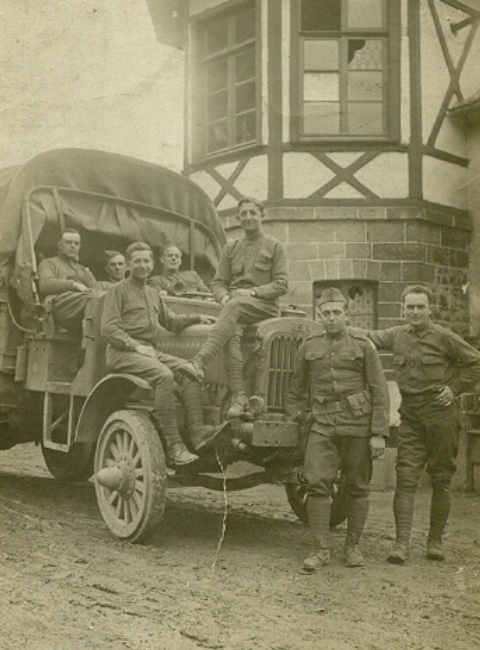
3rd Division soldiers somewhere in France with First-series Liberty truck, 1918

== History ==
The Liberty truck was designed by the Motor Transport section of the Quartermaster Corps in cooperation with the members of the civilian Society of Automotive Engineers. Prototype design of the 3–5 ton truck began in mid-1917, and the first two running prototypes appeared 69 days after the design was finalized in mid-1917. Both trucks were assembled and driven over 400 miles from their assembly locations to Washington D.C., arriving without any major breakages or halts on October 19, 1917 and presented to Secretary of War Newton D. Baker. Following its approval and subsequent small changes to some design and technical aspects, official production of the First-type truck began in January 1918 with parts being produced by 150 different suppliers and assembly contracts awarded to 15 companies. The following are numbers produced in total prior to the signing of the Armistice of 11 November 1918:

  - Bethlehem Motor Truck Corporation of Allentown, PA- 675
  - Brockway Motor Company of Cortland, NY- 589
  - Diamond T Motor Car Company of Chicago, IL- 638
  - Garford Motor Truck Co. of Lima, OH- 978
  - Gramm-Bernstein Company of Lima, OH- 1,000
  - Indiana Truck Corporation of Marion, Indiana, IN- 475
  - Kelly-Springfield Motor Truck Company of Springfield, OH- 301
  - Packard of Detroit, MI- 5
  - Pierce-Arrow Motor Car Company of Buffalo, NY- 975
  - Republic Motor Truck Company of Alma, MI- 967
  - Selden Motor Vehicle Company of Rochester, NY- 1,000
  - Service Motor Truck Company of Wabash, IN- 337
  - Sterling Motor Truck Company of Milwaukee, WI- 479
  - United States Motor Truck Company of Covington, KY- 490
  - Velie Motors Corporation of Moline, IL- 455

Of the 9,364 produced prior to the Armistice, several made it to French shores all of the 1st Series variant with electric lights. The first trucks arrived in early October 1918 and steadily flowed into French ports before and after the Armistice. Few made it into frontline service by wars end. Contracts for an additional 43,000 vehicles were canceled in December 1918 and production halted on trucks entirely by 1919. Following the war, many Class-B Liberty trucks were sold-off surplus to the civilian market and other militaries. Some trucks would see use by foreign armies such as the early Polish Air Force and Army during the Polish-Bolshevik War of 1920-21, as well as with the American Expeditionary Force, Siberia. However, several trucks would continue service with the US Military into the lean days of the late 20s and early 30s receiving engine, body and tire upgrades transforming them into wholly different trucks. The trucks seem to have generally disappeared from military use by 1940.

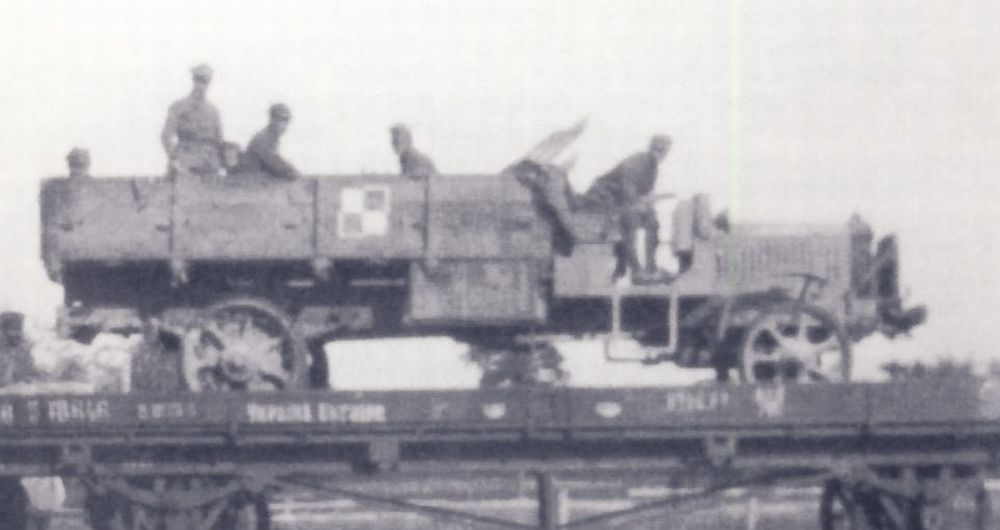
First Series Liberty Truck in use by Polish AirForce ca. 1919-20

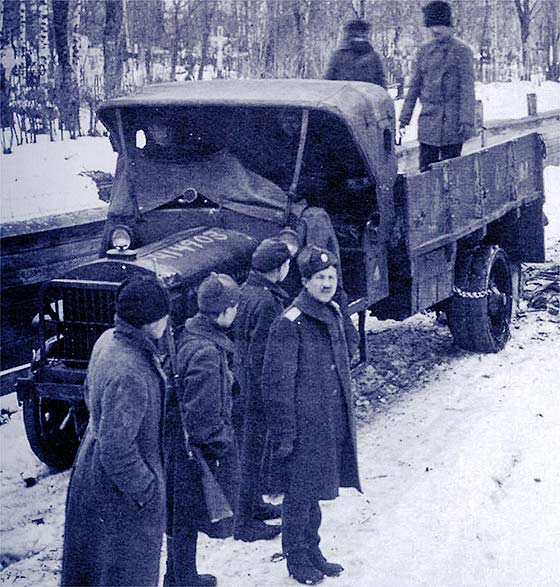
First-series truck with AEF in Siberia near Narwa, ca. 1919

== Variants ==
- Series I
  - Battery, generator and distributor with electrical lighting system, in addition to the independent magneto ignition
  - Distributor and magneto systems with independent sparkplugs and wires (two per cylinder)
  - Ball and coil spring device to hold starter crank up in front
  - Primarily wooden spoke wheels vs. more robust steel wheels but Steel wheels were issued on 1st variant in later production (reference photo of Indiana manufacturing plant storage lot)
  - Single clamp hold-down radiator cap threaded in the center into the radiator
  - Electric side lights
  - Electric Guide lights up front on the frame horn members inside wheel area
  - Electric tail lamp
  - Electrical troubleshooting lamp plug in dash
  - Dual ignition switch on dash for battery and magneto ignition simultaneous operation.
  - Ammeter in dash switch cluster (lights/battery/mag, the gauge and a plug socket for a trouble light)
  - Single dash-mounted fuel tank which gravity fed the carburetor
- Series II
  - Magneto only, (distributor, battery, generator and electrical light systems removed)
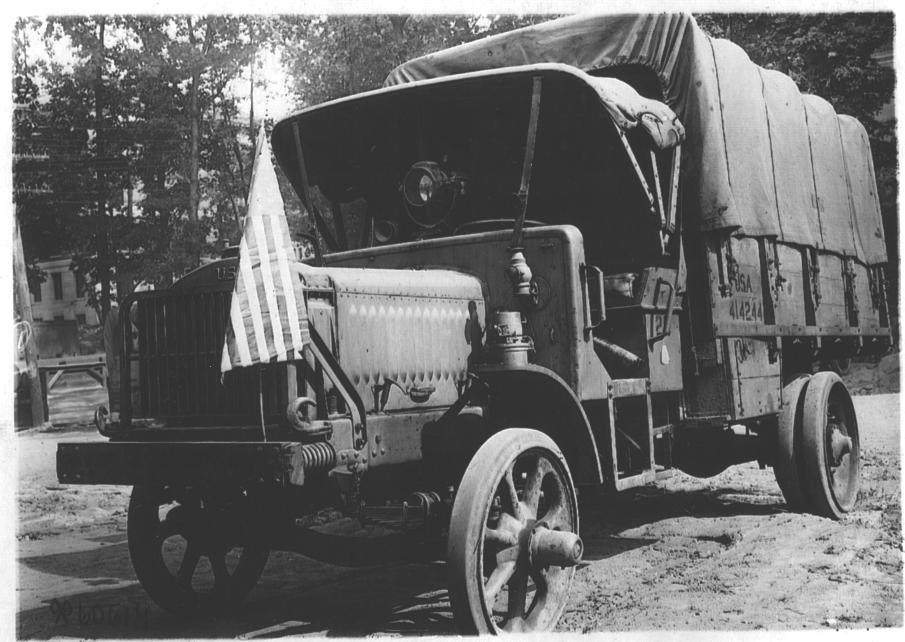
    Second-Series Liberty Truck showing oil side lamps and gas searchlight
  - Pressed steel spring clip to hold starting crank, vs. ball under spring clamp
  - Carbide Gas illuminated spot/driving light in the center of the dashboard powered by 'Solar' brand gas generator
  - Oil wick illuminated side lights (possible transition from electric as they dropped the battery system)
  - Oil wick rear taillamp
  - Spring-mounted oil fill caps raised to vertical level for easier filling on suspension
  - Oil filler for engine moved to rear of block
  - Radiator uses flip-type cap with hinge to rear and lock bolts on the sides
  - Reserve fuel tank under passenger seat
  - Manual fuel transfer hand pump on extreme right of cab for transferring fuel from the underseat-mounted reserve tank to primary dash mounted tank (co-driver job)

A 'Class-C' 6-wheeled truck based upon the Class-B Liberty design was also proposed, but never manufactured during WW1. The extension of the frame and addition of a 3rd axle was a common alteration made to several surplus Class-B trucks in civilian and industrial service. The truck was also commonly encountered in other civilian-built variations with frame-mounted equipment such as drills, cranes, and liquid transport tanks.

== Powertrain ==
The Standard B "Liberty" truck's powertrain utilized a gasoline powered 425 cubic-inch L-head inline four cylinder engine that put out 52 horsepower, a 4 speed transmission, and a 4 X 2 drive setup. The Liberty's four-speed coupled with its engine gave the truck a top speed of about 15 miles per hour (24 km/h). The engine was a collaboration amongst 5 different companies including the Buda Engine Co. (timing gear), Waukesha Engine (timing gear, governor, cylinders), Continental (cylinders, crank case), the Hercules Engine Company (pistons), and the Wisconsin Motor Manufacturing Company (timing gear, oiling system). This was just one example of the collaborative effort involved in designing the truck which helped to speed its production and design.

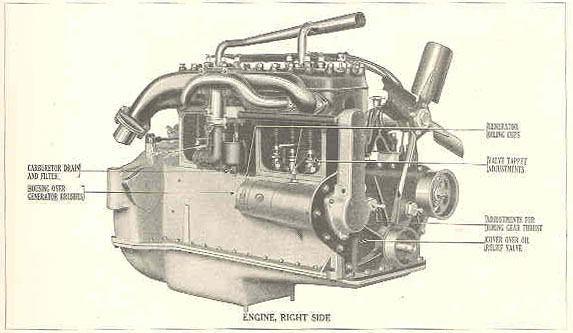
Liberty Truck Engine, Offset right-side Cut-Away

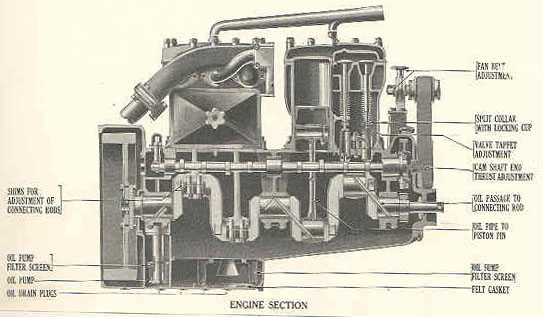
Liberty Truck Engine, Right-side Cut-Awayshowing crankshaft and pistons

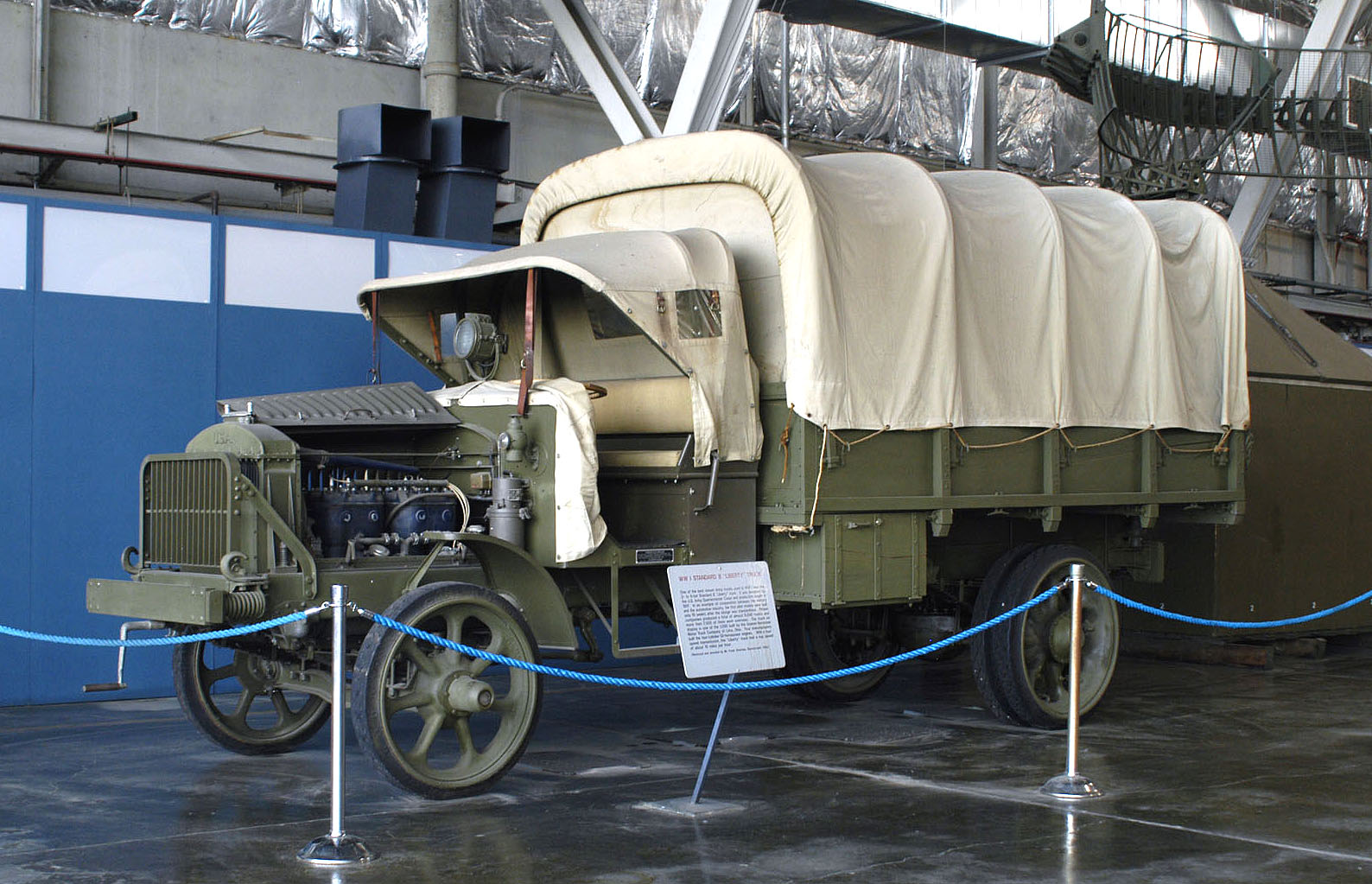
Restored Liberty Truck at the National Museum of the USAF in Dayton, OH

The engine consumed standard gasoline at a rate of about 3.5 to 7 miles per gallon depending on terrain, speed and driving ability. The truck has a maximum fuel capacity of around 22 gallons which includes the primary dash-mounted fuel tank and a larger reserve tank mounted under the right-hand side of the seat box.

== Surviving examples ==
Static:

- There is one at the Fort Sill museum in Oklahoma (previously at the Fort Bliss museum)
- One Second-series truck at the Fort Eustis, U.S. Army Transportation Museum
- One Second-series truck at the National Museum of the United States Air Force Dayton, Ohio
- One with Virginia Military Preservation Association (W. Winget owner) in Virginia (undergoing restoration)
- One at the National Infantry Museum , Columbus, Georgia
- One First-series truck at the Iowa Military museum.
- One at the Allen County Museum, Lima, Ohio.
- One at the Camp Creek showgrounds near Waverly, Nebraska
- One Second-series truck at the National Marine Corps Museum at Quantico. Triangle, Virginia
- One at the Texas Military Forces Museum at Camp Mabry Austin, Texas
- One Second-series truck at the U.S. Veterans Memorial Museum , Huntsville, Alabama.
- Two Second-series trucks at the LeMay Family Collection Foundation Spanaway, Washington.
- three at the WW2 Military Vehicle Federation Museum Florala Alabama (undergoing restoration)
- One First-series at the US Army Aviation Museum at Fort Novosel, Alabama.

Operational:

- One First-series truck at the Oregon Military Museum in Clackamas, Oregon (operational status unknown as of 2018)
- One Second-series truck at the First Division Museum at Cantigny Park in Wheaton, Illinois
- One First-series truck in Dorset, UK under private ownership

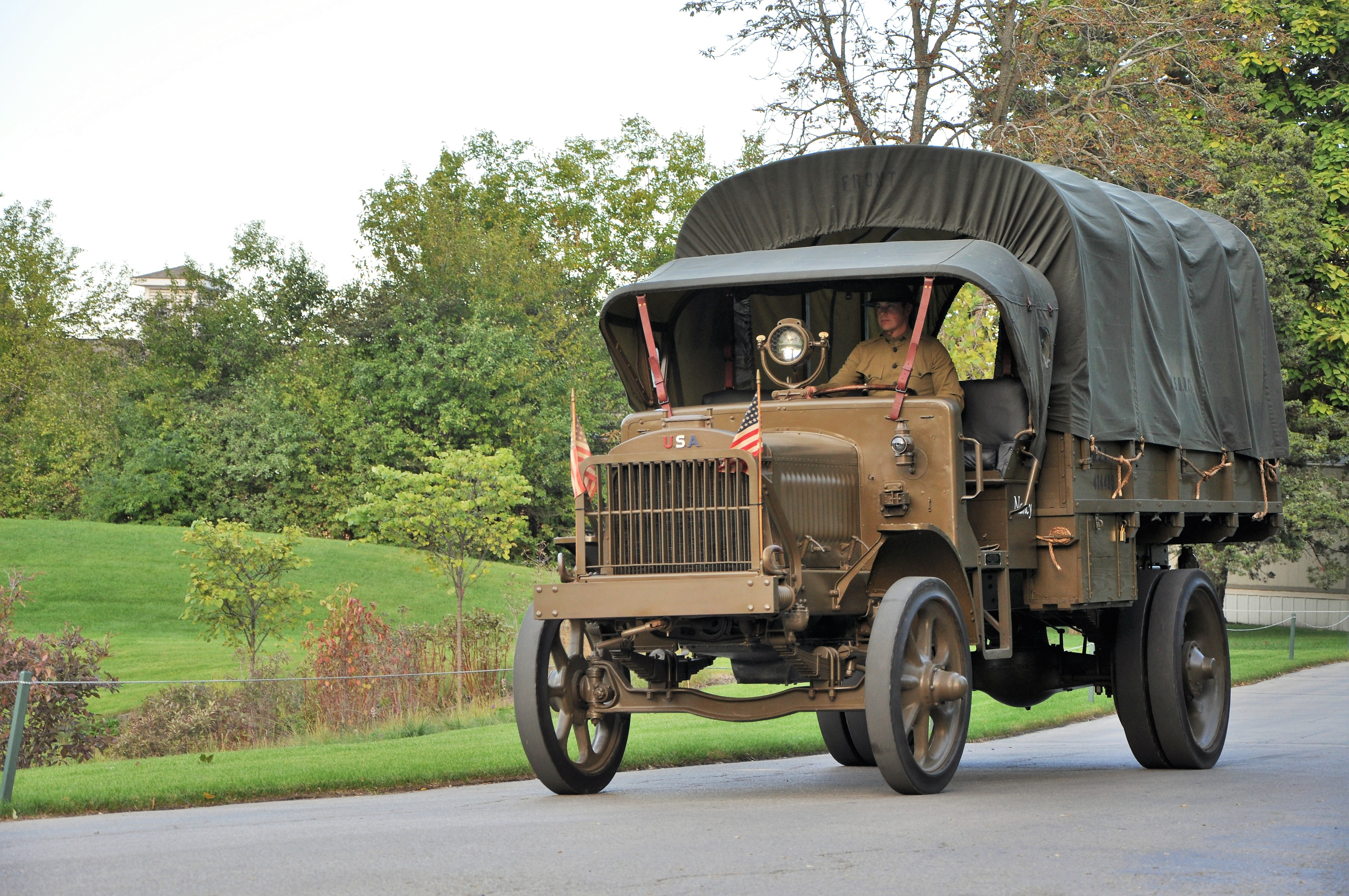
Cantigny Park Liberty Truck, 2018

One First-series truck owned by the Texas Department of Transportation, restored to 1930s civilian configuration

== See also ==
- M1918 light repair truck
- Four Wheel Drive Co.
- Republic Motor Truck Company
- Thomas B. Jeffery Company (Nash Quad)
- Motor Transport Corps (United States Army) (World War I)
- U.S. Army Transportation Corps
