= Indianapolis Foundry =

Defunct manufacturing plant in Indiana, US

- Operated: 1890–2005
- Location: 1100 South Tibbs Ave; Indianapolis, Indiana
- Coordinates: 39.7514°N 86.2181°W
- Industry: Automotive
- Products: Engine blocks
- Employees: 881 (2005)
- Area: 52 acres (0.21 km^{2})
- Owners: American Foundry Co. (1890–1946); Chrysler (1946–2005)
- Defunct: 2005; 21 years ago

Indianapolis Foundry was a Chrysler automobile foundry located at 1100 S. Tibbs Avenue in Indianapolis, Indiana. The factory opened in 1890 as the "American Foundry Company" and was purchased in 1946 by Chrysler and operated as a subsidiary. It became part of Chrysler property in 1946 and expanded in 1964, 1978, 1988, and went through a major remodel from 1996 through 2000. The plant covered 52 acres (210,000 m^{2}) on Indianapolis' west side.

== Brief timeline ==
- 1890s: American Foundry opens in Indianapolis.
- 1910-1920: The foundry makes engine blocks and heads for Apperson, Chalmers, Marmon, Maxwell, Stutz autos, Caterpillar tractors, Stutz fire trucks.
- 1925: Maxwell reorganizes as Chrysler Corporation, turns to American Foundry as an engine block supplier.
- 1930: American Foundry Co Warman plant burns down.
- 1946: Chrysler buys American Foundry.
- 1950: New plant opens at 1100 S. Tibbs Ave.
- 1964: Expansion makes Tibbs foundry Central Indiana's largest.
- 1996: Foundry launches $225 million upgrade.
- 2003: DaimlerChrysler says Indianapolis foundry will close within four years.
- 2005: Foundry closes on September 30, idling final 900 employees.

Foundry/ Brazil S.A. The 3.3/3.8L blocks were outsourced to Bruhl Foundry/ Germany. Current products:

- Cast iron blocks
  - 3.3/3.8 L V6
  - 3.7 L V6
  - 4.7 L V8

== See also ==
- Economy of Indianapolis
