= Motor Transport Corps =

US Army Quartermaster function

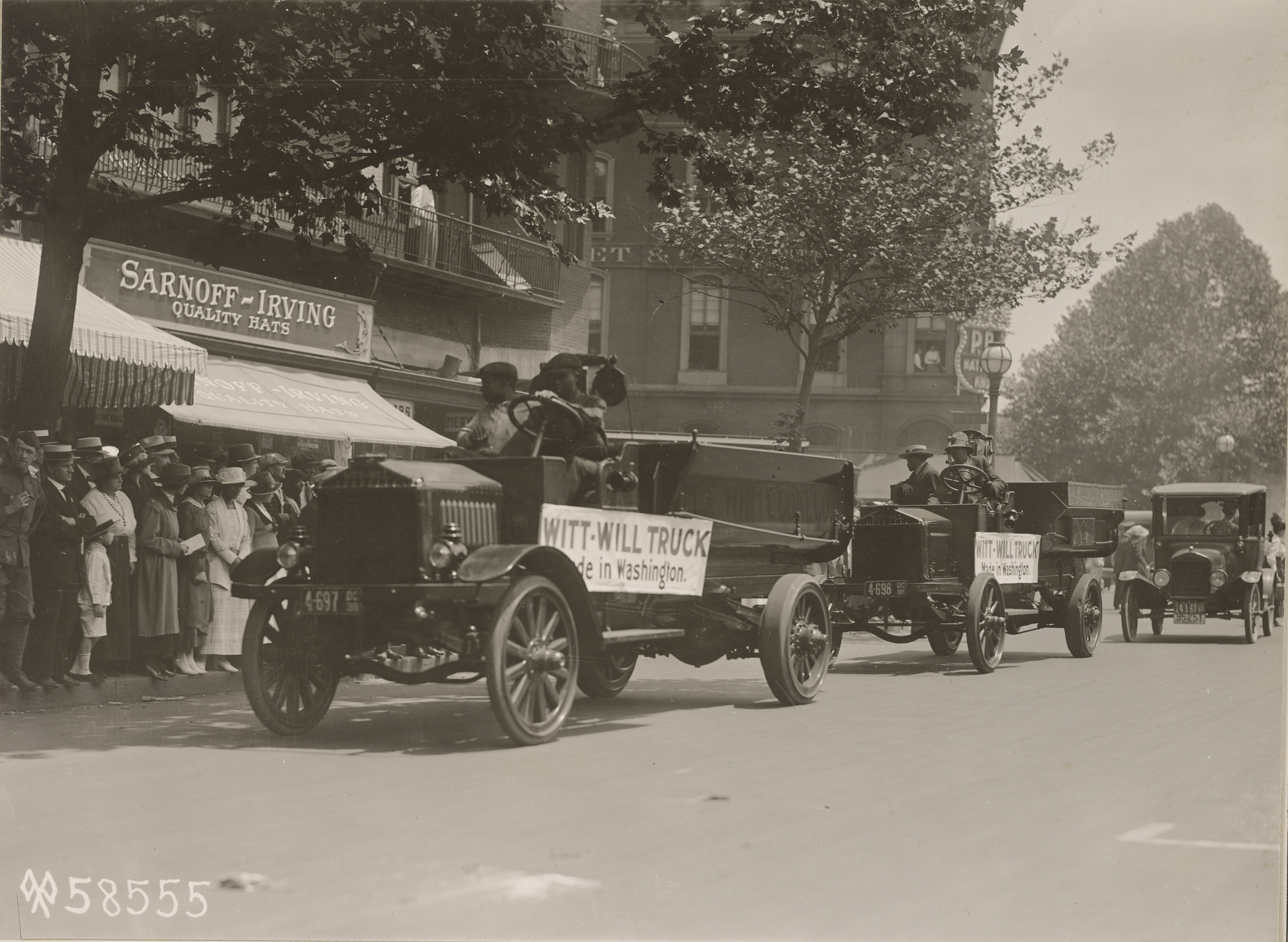
Motor Transport Corps Parade, 1919, Washington D.C.

The Motor Transport Corps (M.T.C.) was formed out of the United States Army Quartermaster Corps on 15 August 1918, by General Order No. 75. Men needed to staff this new corps were recruited from the skilled tradesmen working for automotive manufacturers in the US.

== Organization ==
The first director of the M.T.C. was Brigadier General Meriwether Lewis Walker of Lynchburg, Virginia. Walker was chief engineer of the Pancho Villa Expedition in 1916–17. He was later governor of the Panama Canal Zone. The deputy director was Colonel Francis Horton Pope of Kansas. The M.T.C. was headquartered in Tours during the duration of World War I.

== Functions ==
General Order No. 75 spelled out the functions of the Motor Transport Corps as:

- The technical supervision of all motor vehicles.
- The design, production, procurement, reception, storage, maintenance and replacement of all motor vehicles, and accounting for same.
- The design, production, procurement, storage and supply of Transport Corps garages, parks, depots and repair shops.
- The procurement, organization and technical training of Motor Transport Corps personnel.
- The salvage and evacuation of damaged motor vehicles.
- The homogeneous grouping of motor vehicles.
- The operation, in accordance with instruction from the proper commanding officer as to their employment, of groups of motor vehicles of "First Class".
- The preparation of plans for hauling cargo and personnel over military roads, or roads under military control will be under the control of the Motor Transport Corps.
- The procurement, supply, replacement and preliminary training before assignment to combatant organizations, of personnel for operation of motor vehicles of the "Second Class", will be made by the Motor Transport Corps.

== Types of motor vehicles ==
General Order No. 75 also defined a "motor vehicle" as:

- Bicycles
- Motorcycles
- Automobiles
- Trailers and Trucks

Excluded from this definition were:

- Tractors of the caterpillar type, designed primarily for traction purposes
- Tanks

These were to be under the control of the United States Army Ordnance Department.

== Wartime operation: 1918–1919 ==
Cover page for MTC's "The Steering Wheel" newsletter from December 1918

The American Expeditionary Force that deployed to France during World War I was in need of an organization that could log, track and maintain all needed motor transportation. A school and a network of parks were set up to accomplish this.

=== School ===
All M.T.C. and some non-M.T.C. personnel were to attend training programs to learn operation and repair of motor vehicles. Some courses offered:

- Convoy driving
- Rules of the road
- Oiling, greasing and cleaning
- Map reading
- Motorcycle operation and repair
- Practical shop work
- Repairs of solid and pneumatic tires
- Oxy-acetylene welding

=== Parks ===
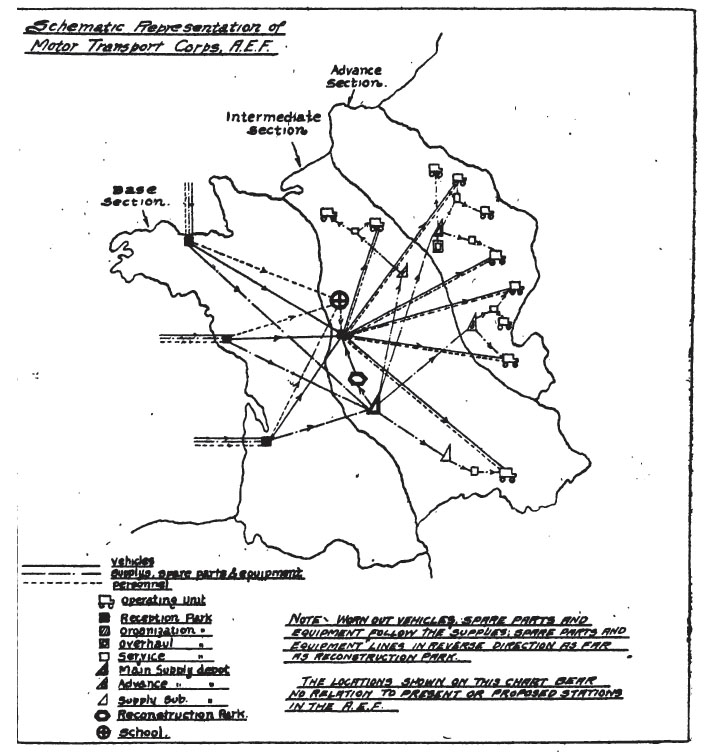
Map of France showing theory of MTC parks layout from the MTC manual

==== Reception Parks ====
Vehicles were unloaded, uncrated and assembled at these parks, then assigned a registration card and markings. Detailed records were kept on each vehicle's whereabouts and conditions. Vehicles and spare parts collected in these parks awaited assignments to specific army units as requested. With the exception of the highest-ranking officers, no officer had his own personal car during the war. A large reception park was located in St. Nazaire.

==== Service parks ====
Designed to make repairs not requiring much time or heavy equipment, these mostly mobile workshops carried a limited stock of spare parts and were mainly assigned to combat zones. Because of their temporary and mobile nature, the service parks were often operating in the open, under canvas, or in any shelter found to be available.

==== Overhaul parks ====
These parks were to occupy permanent or semi-permanent structures for basic vehicle maintenance and repair. They were to be located 30 miles (48 km) behind the fighting zone (40 miles if behind a "thinly held sector"). When the cost of a repair exceeded 30% of the first cost of the vehicle, they were to be sent to a reconstruction park for salvage.

==== Reconstruction park ====
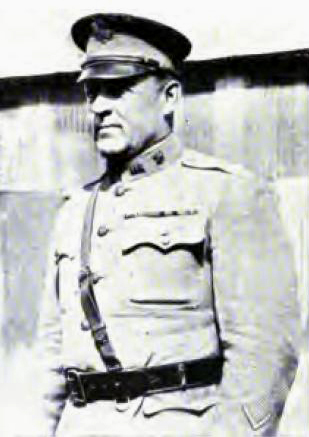
Col. Harry A. Hegeman

A permanent facility equipped for large scale rebuilding and salvage operations. A temporary park in Nevers was relocated in July 1918 to a permanent facility in Verneuil, Nièvre, 30 miles (48 km) east of Nevers, which salvaged more than 10,000 vehicles. The M.T.C. Reconstruction Park covered approximately 1,000 acres (4 km^{2}) and consisted of five steel shops averaging 25,000 sq ft (2,300 m^{2}) each and a large warehouse for storage of spare parts. The park was staffed by three units of approximately 1,150 men each (Units 301, 302, and 303). Some labor was also supplied by German prisoners who were housed inside the Park.

Command of the park at Verneuil was assigned to Colonel Harry A. ("Bull") Hegeman, who was awarded the Distinguished Service Medal for his involvement in the operation, in spite of the post-war accusation of mismanagement and waste there. Hegeman was a mechanical engineer from Sparta, Wisconsin.

== Post-war: 1919–1920 ==
According to the M.T.C. Reconstruction Park newsletter "Let's Go", the park was visited by General John J. Pershing and later, General James Harbord, in April 1919.

The parks in France were closed after the war, and the Motor Transport Corps subsequently conducted Transcontinental Motor Convoys in the United States in 1919 and 1920. The M.T.C. was dissolved in 1920.

== See also ==
- G-numbers
- M1918 light repair truck
- Liberty truck
- World War I
- U.S. Army Transportation Corps
- U.S. Army Transportation Museum
- United States Army Quartermaster Corps
