= Road train =

Type of trucking vehicle

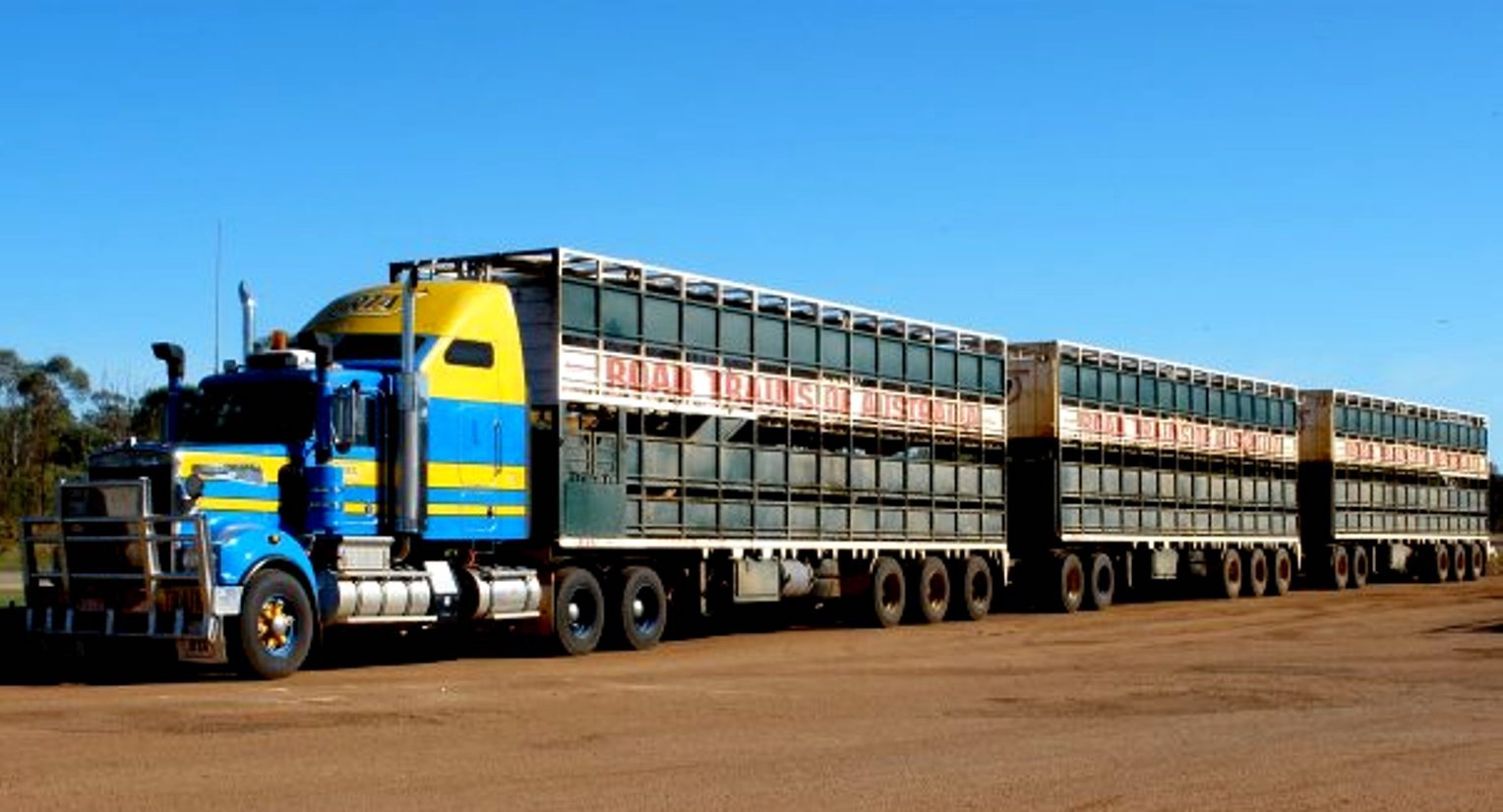
A three-trailer livestock road train in Australia

A road train, also known as a land train or long combination vehicle (LCV), is a semi-trailer truck used to move road freight more efficiently than single-trailer semi-trailers. It consists of two semi-trailers or more connected together with or without a prime mover. It typically has to be at least two trailers and one prime mover. Road trains are often used in areas where other forms of heavy transport (freight train, cargo aircraft, container ship) are not feasible or practical.

== History ==
Longitudinal section of Ransome's "Ravee" steam road locomotive and tender, 1871

Indian Transport Service road train, 1870s

Early road trains consisted of traction engines pulling multiple wagons. The first identified road trains operated into South Australia's Flinders Ranges from the Port Augusta area in the mid-19th century. They displaced bullock teams for the carriage of minerals to port and were, in turn, superseded by railways.

From the 1870s road trains hauled by traction engines using R.W.Thomson's solid India-rubber tyres were used in areas which railways had yet to reach. His tyres (patented in 1867) provided cushioning and increased adhesion, providing the haulage power of an engine twice its weight (important over bridges). They were protected by flexible multi-part metal shoes which completely encased the tyre (see image). A notable example was Ransome's 14 hp "Ravee", built for the Indian Government. Before being exported, it was tested in October 1871 by being driven 850 miles from Ipswich to Edinburgh and back, averaging 7 mph for 7 hours/day on the return trip.

During the Crimean War, a traction engine was used to pull multiple open trucks. By 1898 steam traction engine trains with up to four wagons were employed in military manoeuvres in England.

In 1900, John Fowler & Company provided armoured road trains for use by the British Armed Forces in the Second Boer War. Lord Kitchener stated that he had around 45 steam road trains at his disposal.

A road train devised by Captain Charles Renard of the French Engineering Corps was displayed at the 1903 Paris Salon. After his death, Daimler, which had acquired the rights, attempted to market it in the United Kingdom. Four of these vehicles were successfully delivered to Queensland, Australia, before the company ceased production upon the start of World War I.

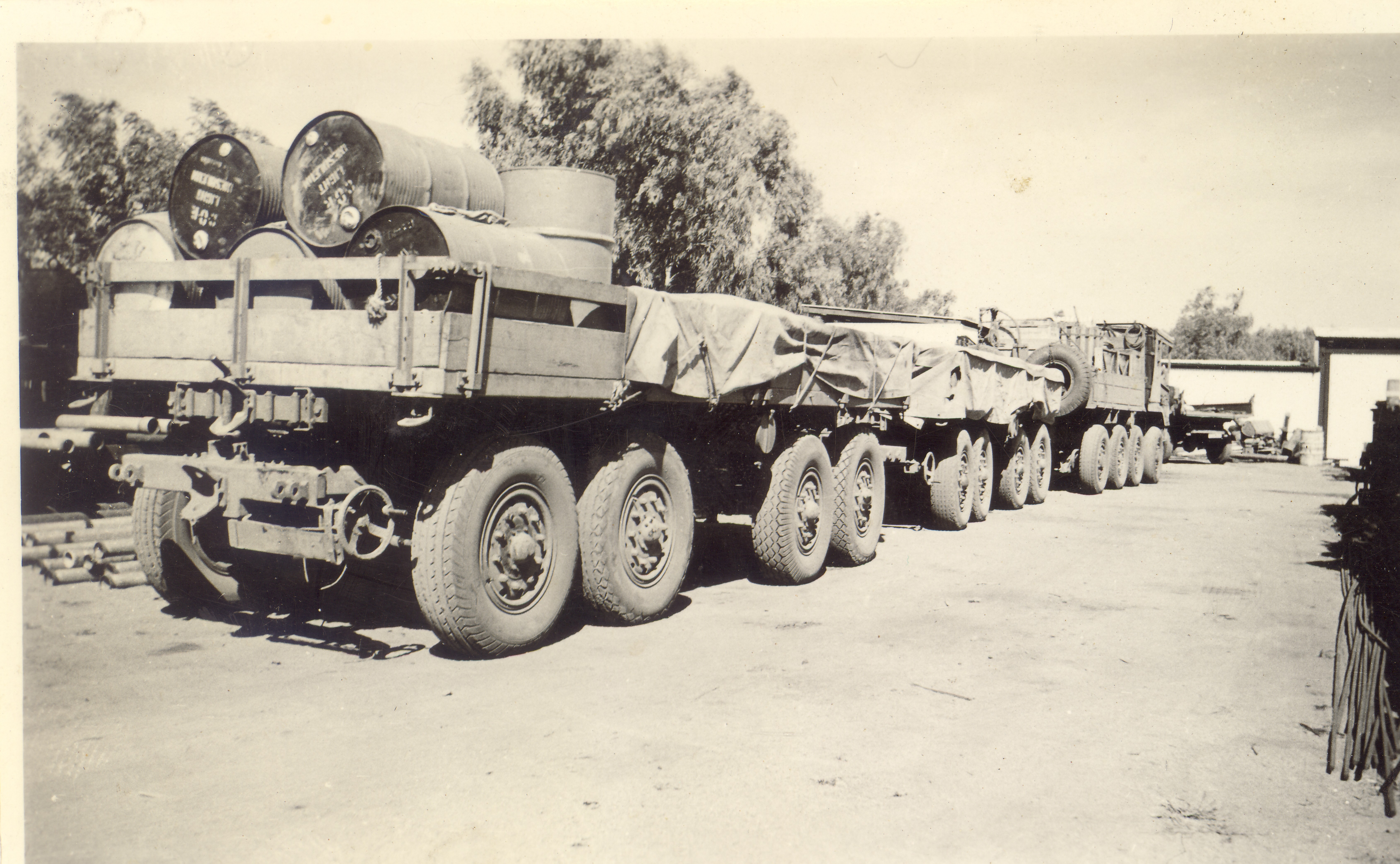
An early road train at Alice Springs on the way to Tennant Creek, c. 1938–1948

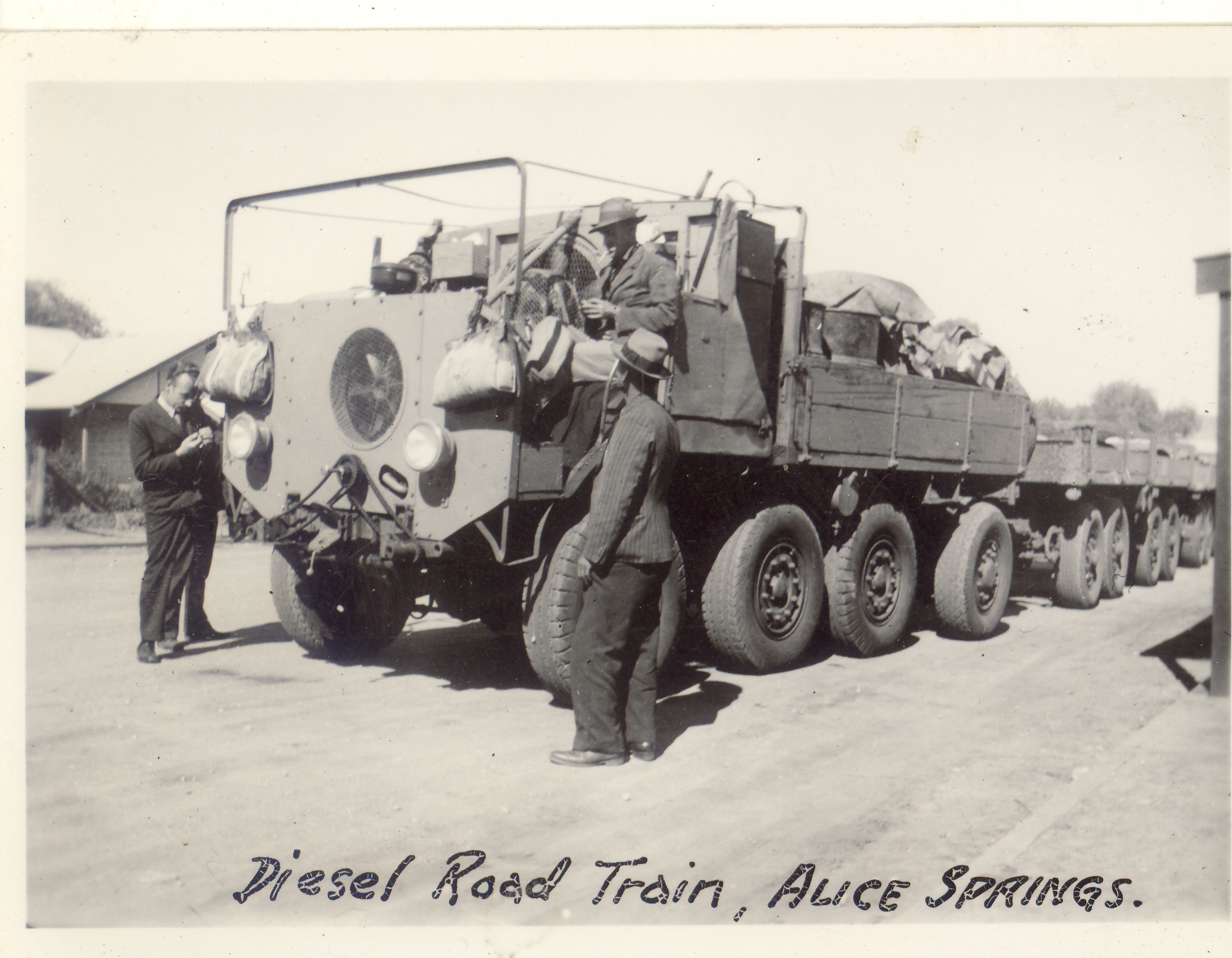
A diesel road train in Alice Springs, c. 1938–1939

In the 1930s/40s, the government of Australia operated an AEC Roadtrain to transport freight and supplies into the Northern Territory, replacing the Afghan camel trains that had been trekking through the deserts since the late 19th century. This truck pulled two or three 6 m (19 ft 8 in) Dyson four-axle self-tracking trailers. At 130 hp (97 kW), the AEC was grossly underpowered by today's standards, and drivers and offsiders (a partner or assistant) routinely froze in winter and sweltered in summer due to the truck's open cab design and the position of the engine radiator, with its 1.5 m (4 ft 11 in) cooling fan, behind the seats.

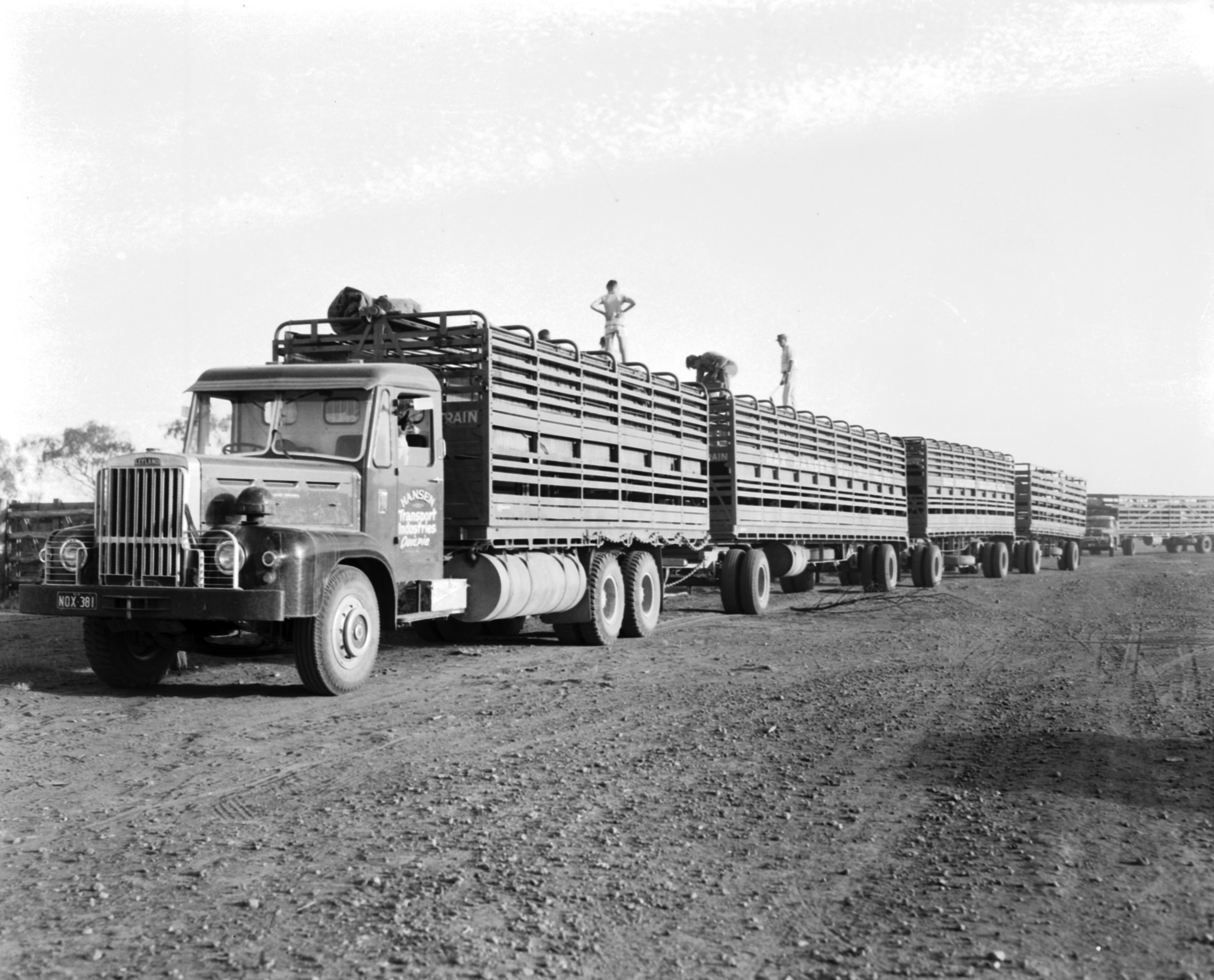
Livestock road train with Leyland truck in 1962

Australian Kurt Johannsen, a bush mechanic, is recognised as the inventor of the modern road train. After transporting stud bulls 200 mi (320 km) to an outback property, Johannsen was challenged to build a truck to carry 100 head of cattle instead of the original load of 20. Provided with financing of about 2000 pounds and inspired by the tracking abilities of the Government roadtrain, Johannsen began construction. Two years later his first road train was running.

Johannsen's first road train consisted of a United States Army World War II surplus Diamond-T tank carrier, nicknamed "Bertha", and two home-built self-tracking trailers. Both wheel sets on each trailer could steer, and therefore could negotiate the tight and narrow tracks and creek crossings that existed throughout Central Australia in the earlier part of the 20th century. Freighter Trailers in Australia viewed this improved invention and went on to build self-tracking trailers for Kurt and other customers, and went on to become innovators in transport machinery for Australia.

This first example of the modern road train, along with the AEC Government Roadtrain, forms part of the collection at the National Road Transport Museum in Alice Springs.

In 2023, Janus launched the first battery electric (BEV) triple road train with 620 kWh battery, also the world's heaviest street-legal BEV truck at 170 tonnes (gross weight).

== Usage ==
=== Australia ===
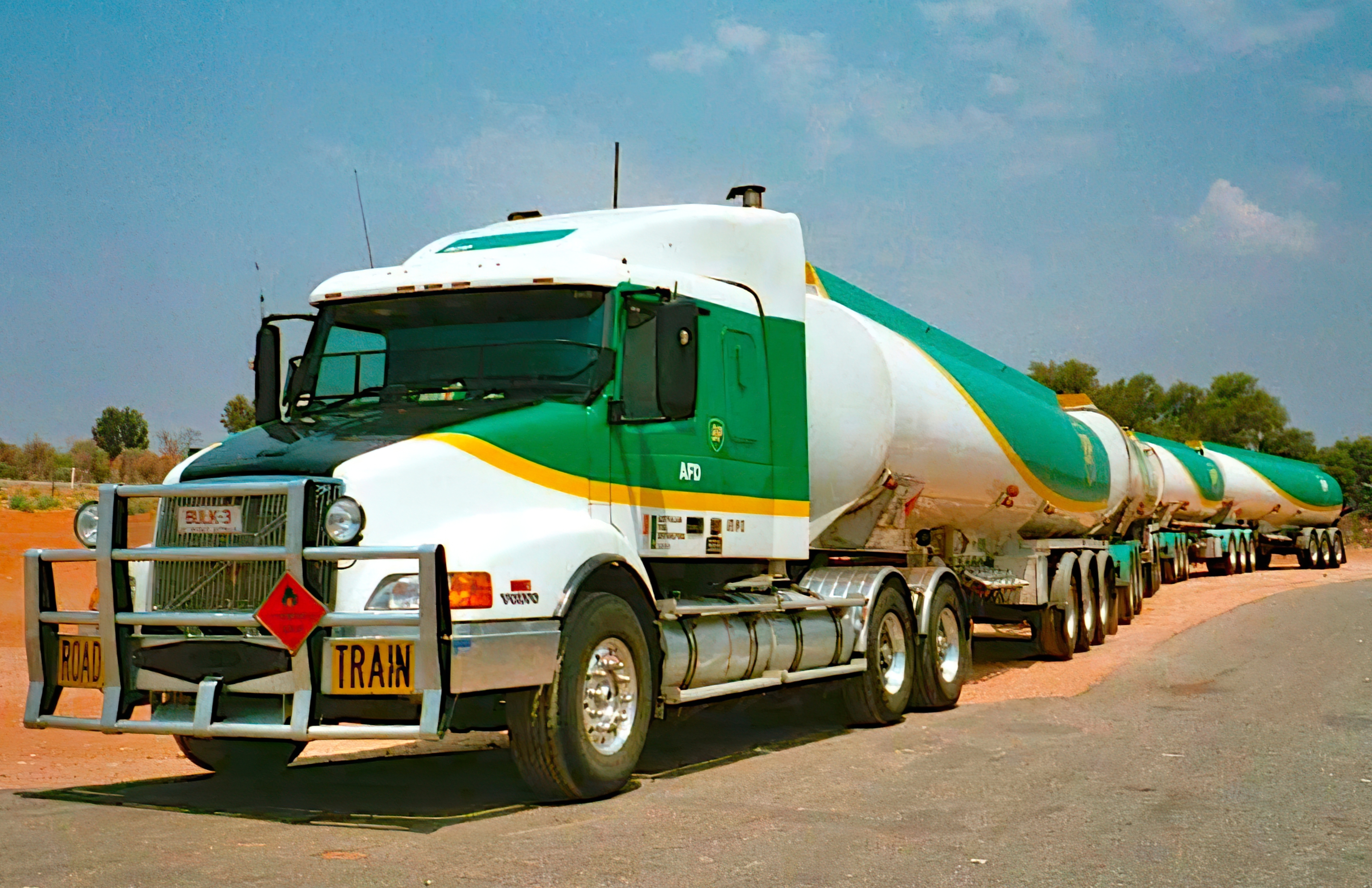
A four-trailer road train in the Australian outback with a Volvo NH15 prime mover

The term road train is used in Australia and typically means a prime mover hauling two or more trailers, other than a B-double. In contrast with a more common semi-trailer towing one trailer or semi-trailer, the diesel prime mover of a road train hauls two or more trailers or semi-trailers. Australia has the longest and heaviest road-legal road trains in the world, weighing up to 200 tonnes (197 long tons; 220 short tons).

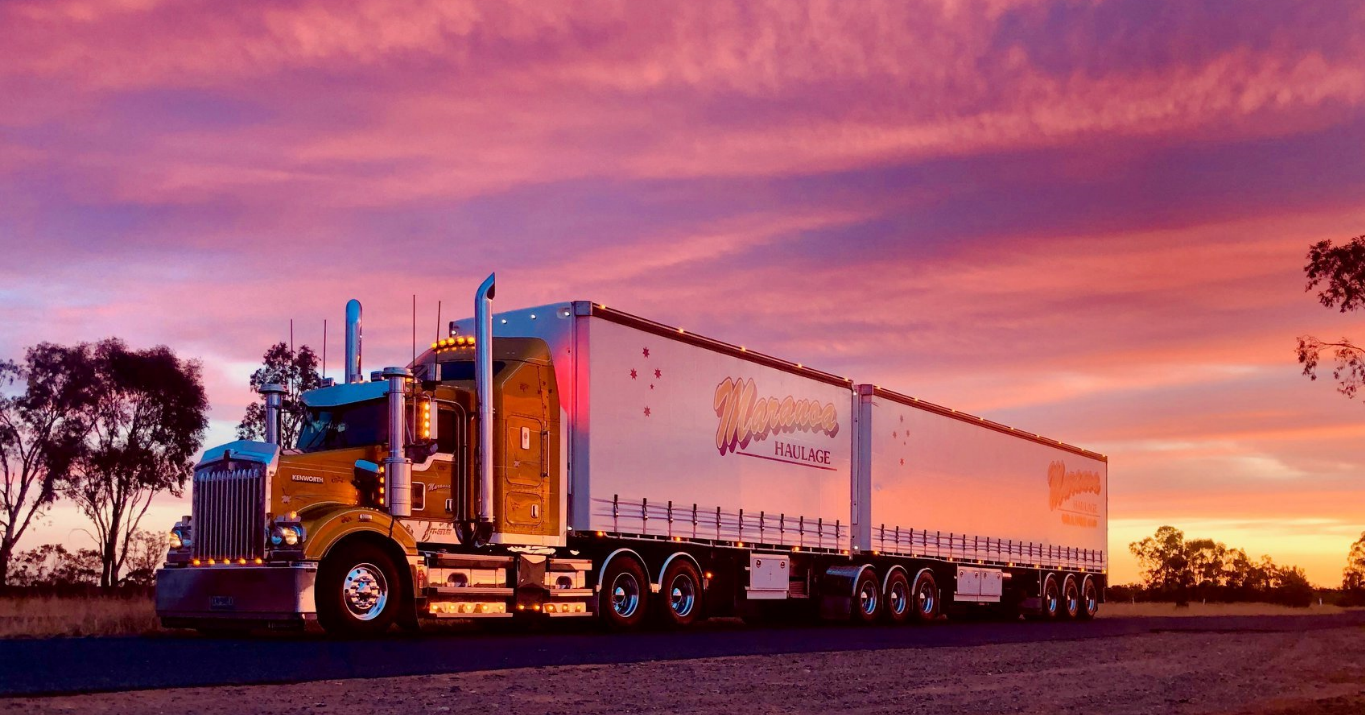
B-double

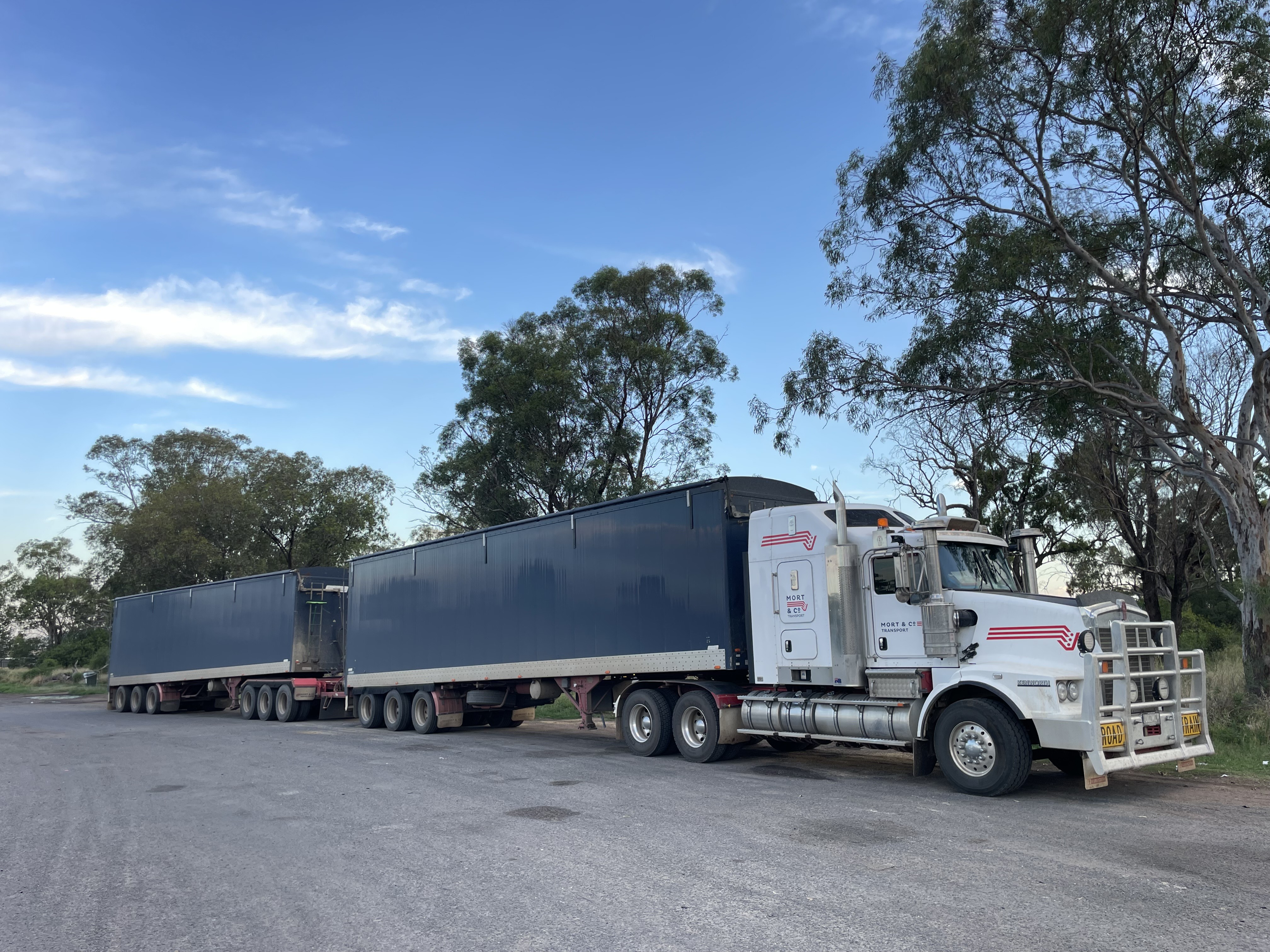
Double road train at Narrabri, New South Wales

Double (two-trailer) road train combinations are allowed on some roads in most states of Australia, including specified approaches to the ports and industrial areas of Adelaide, South Australia and Perth, Western Australia. An A-double road train should not be confused with a B-double, which is allowed access to most of the country and in all major cities.

In South Australia, B-triples up to 35.0 metres (114 ft 10 in) and two-trailer road trains to 36.5 metres (119 ft 9 in) are permitted on only a small number of approved routes in the north and west of the state, including access to Adelaide's north-western suburban industrial and export areas such as Port Adelaide, Gillman and Outer Harbour via Salisbury Highway, Port Wakefield Road and Augusta Highway before 2017. A project named Improving Road Transport for the Agriculture Industry added 7,200 kilometres (4,500 mi) of key routes on which it is permitted to operate vehicles over 30 m (98 ft 5 in) in 2015–2018.

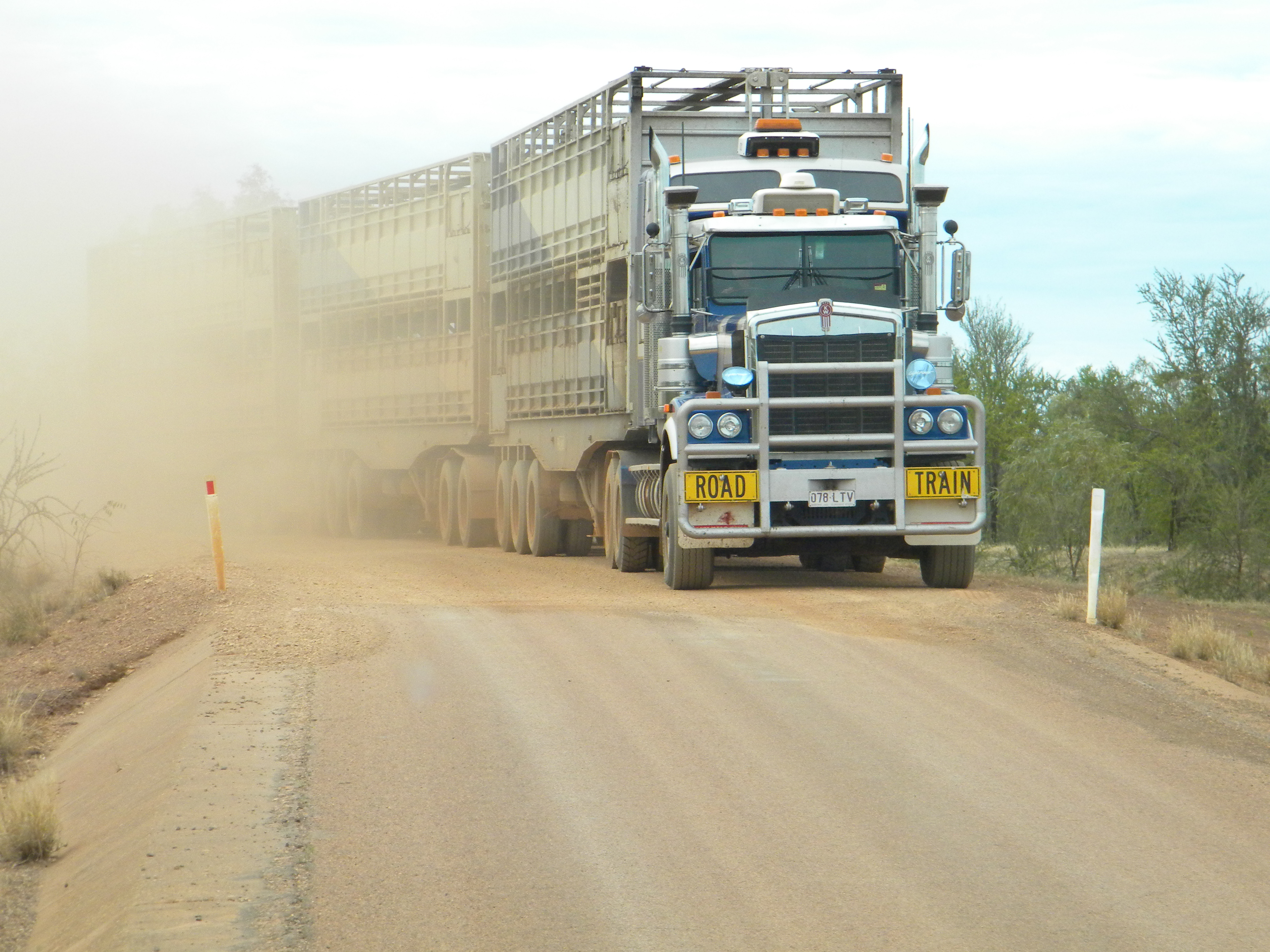
Triple road train near Normanton, Queensland

Triple (three-trailer) road trains operate in western New South Wales, western Queensland, South Australia, Western Australia, and the Northern Territory, with the last three states also allowing AB-quads (a B double with two additional trailers coupled behind). Darwin is the only capital city in the world where triples and quads are allowed to within 1 km (0.62 mi) of the central business district (CBD).

Strict regulations regarding licensing, registration, weights, and experience apply to all operators of road trains throughout Australia.

Road trains are used for transporting all manner of materials; common examples are livestock, fuel, mineral ores, and general freight. Their cost-effective transport has played a significant part in the economic development of remote areas; some communities are totally reliant on regular service.

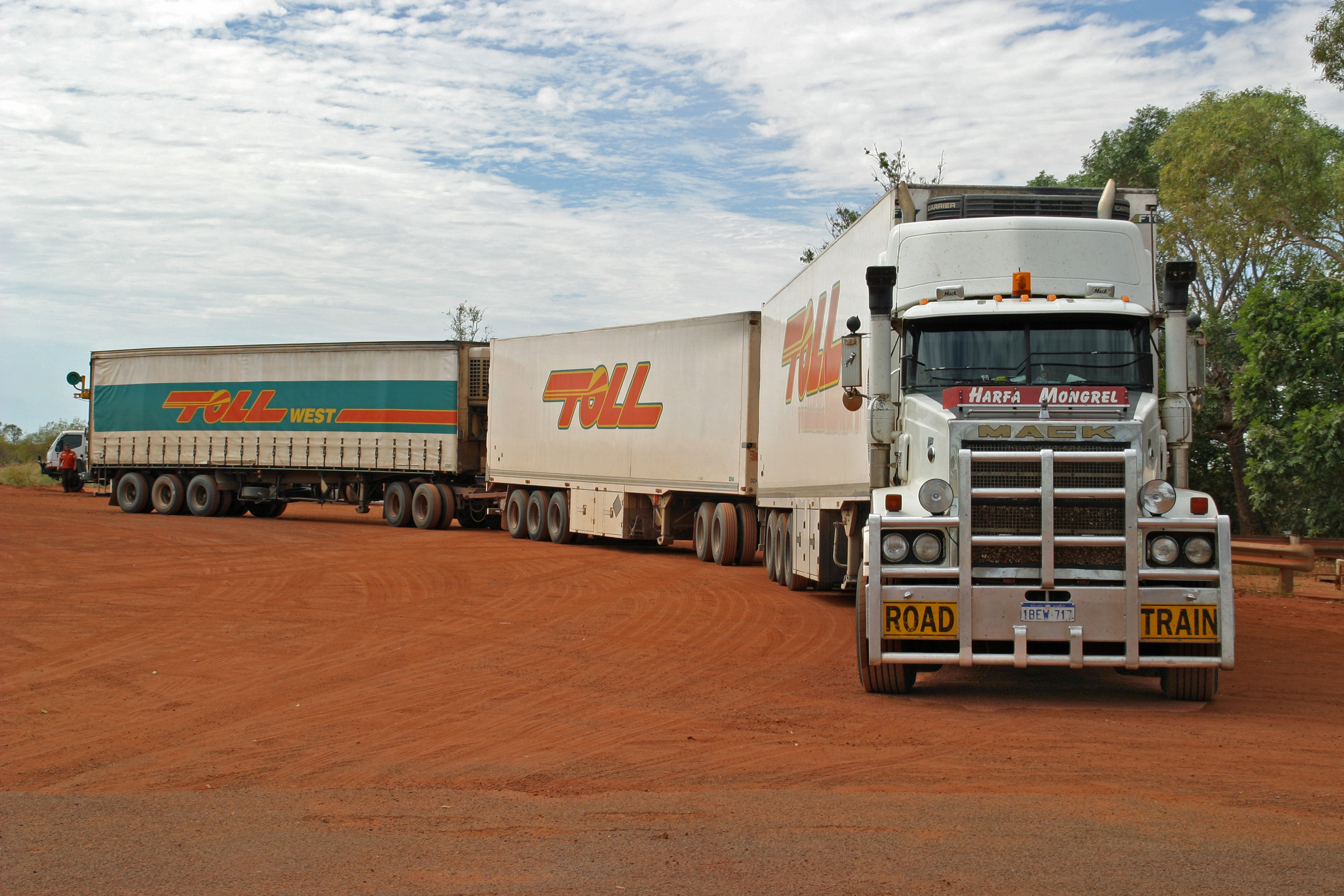
Triple road train in Great Northern Highway

When road trains get close to populated areas, the multiple dog-trailers are unhooked, the dollies removed and then connected individually to multiple trucks at "assembly" yards.

When the flat-top trailers of a road train need to be transported empty, it is common practice to stack them. This is commonly referred to as "doubled-up" or "doubling-up". If many trailers must be moved at one time, they are sometimes triple-stacked, or "tripled-up".

Higher Mass Limits (HML) Schemes are now extant in all jurisdictions in Australia, allowing trucks to carry additional weight beyond general mass limits. Some roads in some states regularly allowing up to 4 trailers at 53.5 metres (175 ft 6 in) long and 136 tonnes (134 long tons; 150 short tons). On private property such as mines, highway restrictions on trailer length, weight, and count may not apply. Some of the heaviest road trains carrying ore are multiple unit with a diesel engine in each trailer, controlled by the tractor.

Diesel sales in Australia (per year) are around 32 billion litres, of which some is used by road trains. In order to reduce emissions and running cost, trials are made with road trains powered by batteries.

=== United States ===
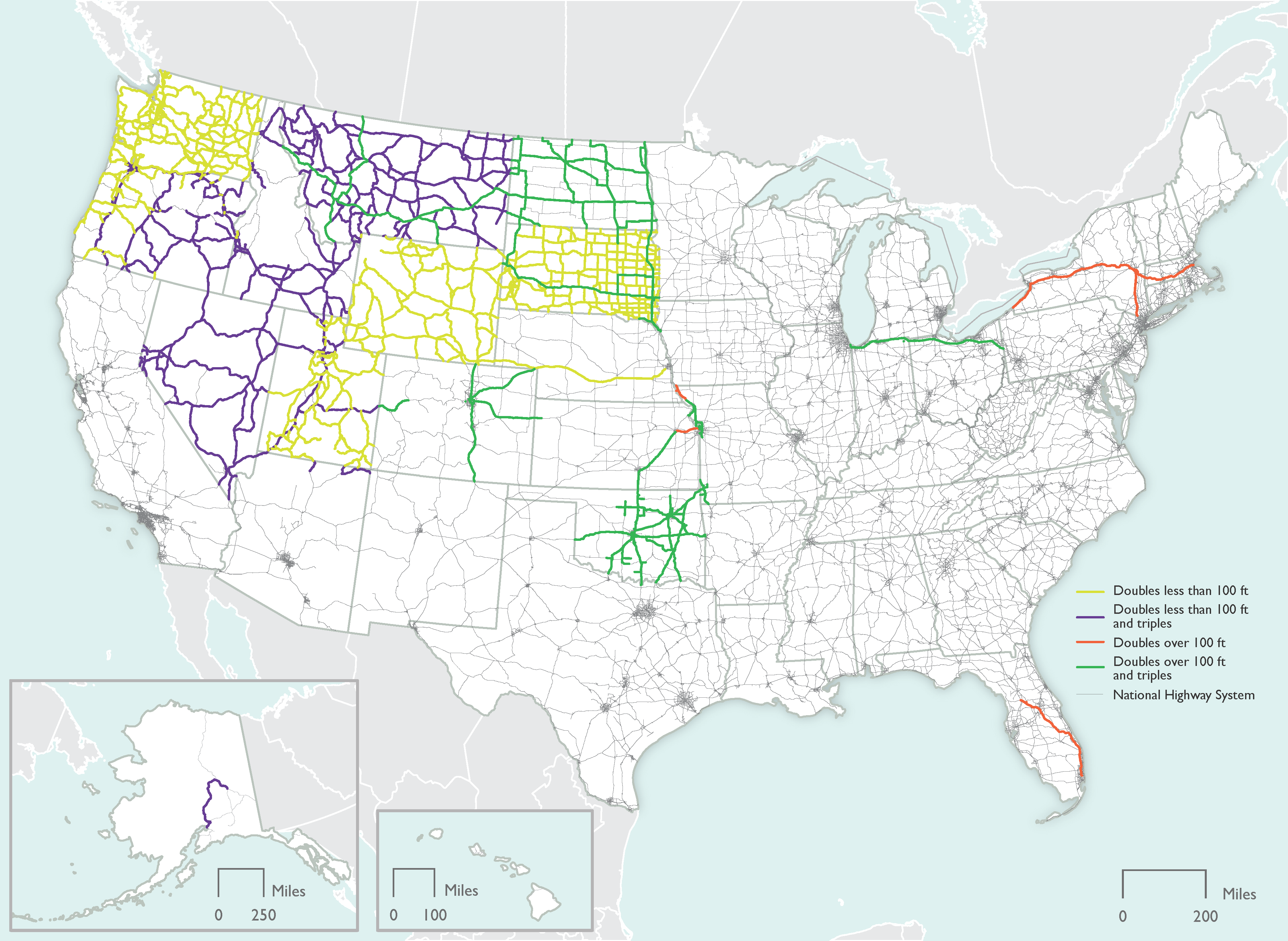
Permitted routes for longer combination vehicles on the U.S. National Highway System: 2017

In most of the United States, trucks on public roads are limited to two trailers (two 28 ft or 8.5 m and a dolly to connect; the limit is 63 ft or 19 m end to end). Some states allow three 28 ft or 8.5 m trailers, although triples are usually restricted to less populous states such as Idaho, Oregon, and Montana, plus the Ohio Turnpike and the Indiana East–West Toll Road. Triples are used for long-distance less-than-truckload freight hauling (in which case the trailers are shorter than a typical single-unit trailer) or resource hauling in the interior west (such as ore or aggregate). Triples are sometimes marked with "LONG LOAD" banners both front and rear. "Turnpike doubles"—tractors towing two full-length trailers—are allowed on the New York Thruway and Massachusetts Turnpike (Interstate 90), Florida's Turnpike, Kansas Turnpike (Kansas City – Wichita route) as well as the Ohio and Indiana toll roads. Colorado allows what are known as "Rocky Mountain Doubles" which is one full length 53 ft or 16 m trailer and an additional 28 ft or 8.5 m trailer. The term "road train" is not commonly used in the United States; "turnpike train" has been used, generally in a pejorative sense.

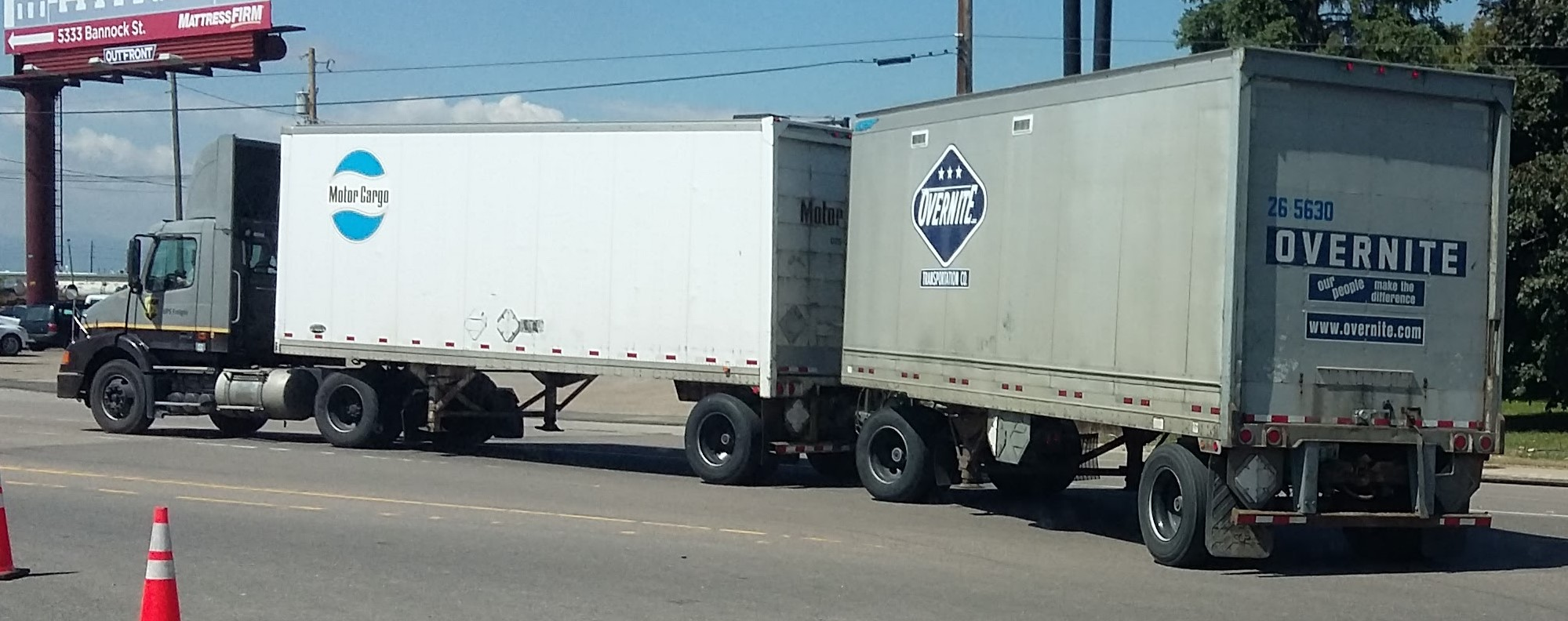
STAA double pup 28.5 foot trailers

In the western United States LCVs are allowed on many Interstate highways. The only LCVs allowed nationwide are STAA doubles.

On private property such as farms, highway restrictions on trailer length and count do not apply. Bales of straw, for example, are sometimes moved using wagon trains of up to 20 trailers extending an eighth of a mile and carrying a total of 3,600 bales.

=== Europe ===
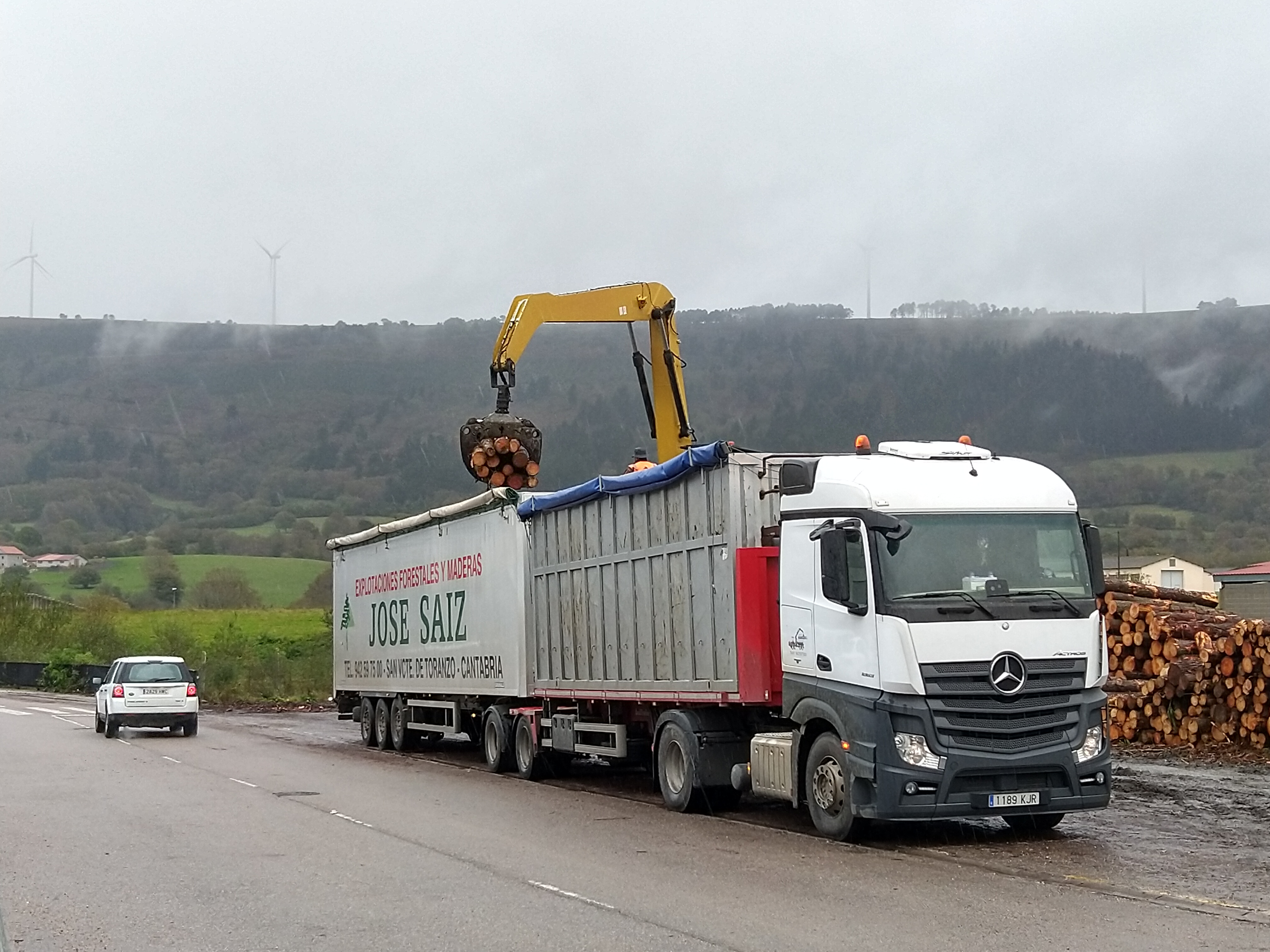
Timber being unloaded from a B-double at Pellets Asturias, Spain

In Finland, Sweden, Germany, the Netherlands, Denmark, Belgium, and some roads in Norway, trucks with trailers are allowed to be 25.25 m (82.8 ft) long. In Finland, a length of 34.5 metres (113 ft) has been allowed since January 2019. In Sweden, this length has been allowed on several major roads, including all of E4, since August 2023. 34.5 metres allows two 40 foot containers.

Elsewhere in the European Union, the limit is 18.75 m (61.5 ft) (Norway allows 19.5 m or 64 ft). The trucks are of a cab-over-engine design, with a flat front and a high floor about 1.2 m (3.9 ft) above ground. Scandinavian countries are less densely populated than most of the rest of the EU, and travel distances there, especially in Finland and Sweden, are long. Until the late 1960s, vehicle length was unlimited, giving rise to long vehicles to cost effectively handle goods. As traffic increased, truck lengths became more of a concern and they were limited, albeit at a more generous level than in the rest of Europe.

In the United Kingdom in 2009, a two-year desk study of Longer Heavier Vehicles (LHVs), including up to 11-axle, 34-metre (111.5 ft) long, 82-tonne (81-long-ton; 90-short-ton) combinations, ruled out all road-train-type vehicles for the foreseeable future.

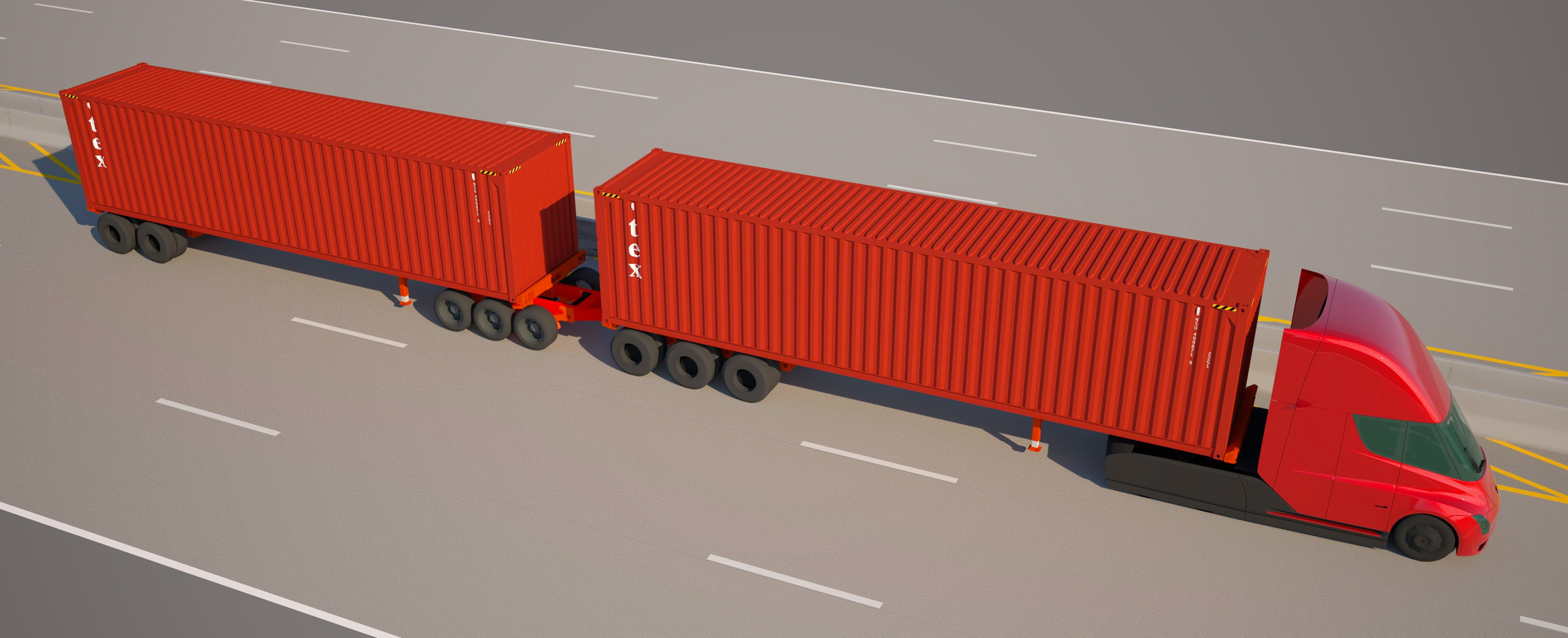
40 foot container turnpike double

In 2010, Sweden performed tests on log-hauling trucks, weighing up to 90 t (89 long tons; 99 short tons) and measuring 30 metres (98.4 ft) and haulers for two 40 ft containers, measuring 32 metres (105 ft) in total. In 2015, a pilot began in Finland to test a 104-tonne timber lorry which was 33 metres (108 ft) and had 13 axles. Testing of the special lorry was limited to a predefined route in northern Finland

Since 2015, Spain has permitted B-doubles with a length of up to 25.25 metres (82.8 ft) and weighing up to 60 tonnes to travel on certain routes. In July 2024, after 5 years of testing, HCTs have been permitted on Spanish territory, with lengths of up to 32 metres (105 ft) and 70 gross tonnes.

Since 2016, Eoin Gavin Transport, Shannon and Dennison Trailers, Kildare have been trialling 25.25 metres (82.8 ft) B-doubles on the Irish motorways. In Feb 2024, The Pallet Network announced four B-doubles to operate between Dublin, Cork and Galway.

In 2020, a small number of road trains were operating between Belgium and the Netherlands.

=== Mexico ===
In Mexico road trains exist in a limited capacity due to the sizes of roads in its larger cities, and they are only allowed to pull 2 trailers joined with a pup or dolly created for this purpose. Recently the regulations tend to be more severe and strict to avoid overloading and accidents, to adhere to the federal rules of transportation. Truck drivers must obtain a certificate to certify that the driver is capable to manipulate and drive that type of vehicle.

All the tractor vehicles that make road train type transport in the country (along with the normal security requirements) need to have visual warnings like;

- "Warning Double Semi-Trailer" (Spanish: Precaución Doble Semirremolque) alert located in the frontal fenders of the tractor and in the rear part of each trailer,
- yellow turn and warning lights to be more visible to other drivers,
- a seal for the entire vehicle approving the use as double semi trailer,
- federal license plates in every trailer, dolly, and tractor unit.

Some major cargo enterprises in the country use this form to cut costs of carrying all type of goods in some regions where other forms of transportation are too expensive compared to it due to the difficult geography of the country.

The Mexican road train equivalent form in Australian Standard is the A-Double form, the difference is that the Mexican road trains can be hauled with a long distance tractor truck.

=== Zimbabwe ===
In Zimbabwe, they are used on only one highway, Ngezi–Makwiro road. They make use of 42 m long road trains pulling three trailers.

=== India ===
In India beacon lights and road-train signs are mandatory, one on the windshield of the tractor and another on the rear of the trailer. These signals should also identicate what type of combination is being used. The configuration should be equipped with CAN network system, Electronic Braking System (EBS) to increase safety. Following this, companies are also using 360° camera systems and steerable axles for ease of driving.

4x2, 6x2 and 6x4 tractors can be used for the combination driven by a heavy vehicle drivers licence personal. With a speed limit of 50kmph at selected routes and corridors the combination has to have a Turning Clearance Circle Diameter (TCCD) of 28m using fifth wheel, drawbar and converter dolly couplings.

On 15 February 2025 Volvo Trucks India and Delhivery a Gurgaon based logistics company unveiled India's first road train consisting of a Volvo FM 420 4x2 tractor and a B-Double combination of 24 ft lead trailer and 44 ft semi-trailer coupled via fifth wheel making total length of vehicle close to 80 ft. With approvals from Ministry of Road Transport and Highways (MORTH) and Automotive Research Association of India (ARAI). Currently, road trains are only permitted to operate on Mumbai-Nagpur Expressway.

== Trailer arrangements ==
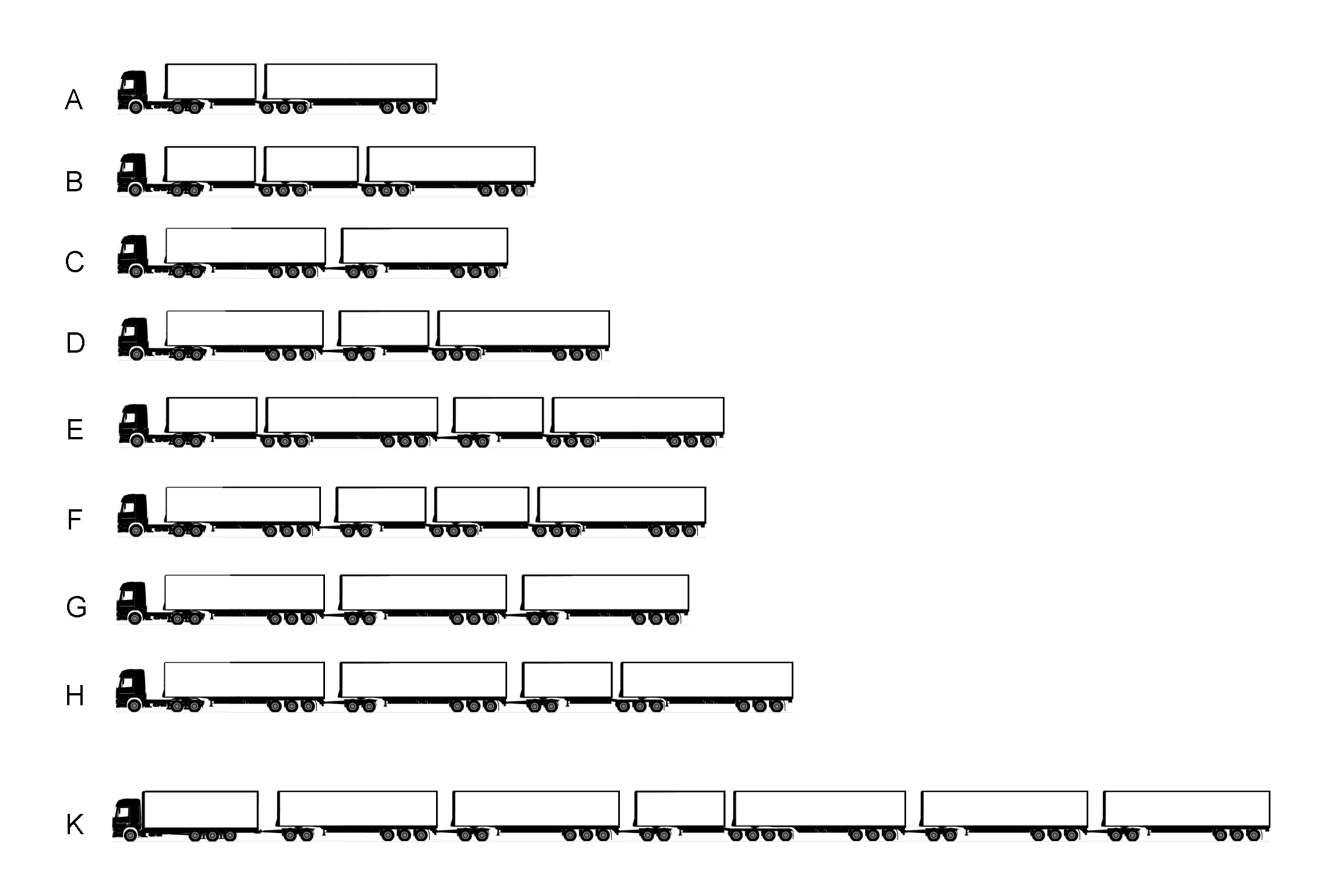
Road train types: A: B-double B: B-triple C: A-double D: AB-triple (possible BA) E: BAB quad F: ABB quad G: A-triple H: AAB quad (possible BAA) K: Special Australian mining tipper road train with limited transportation

=== A-double ===
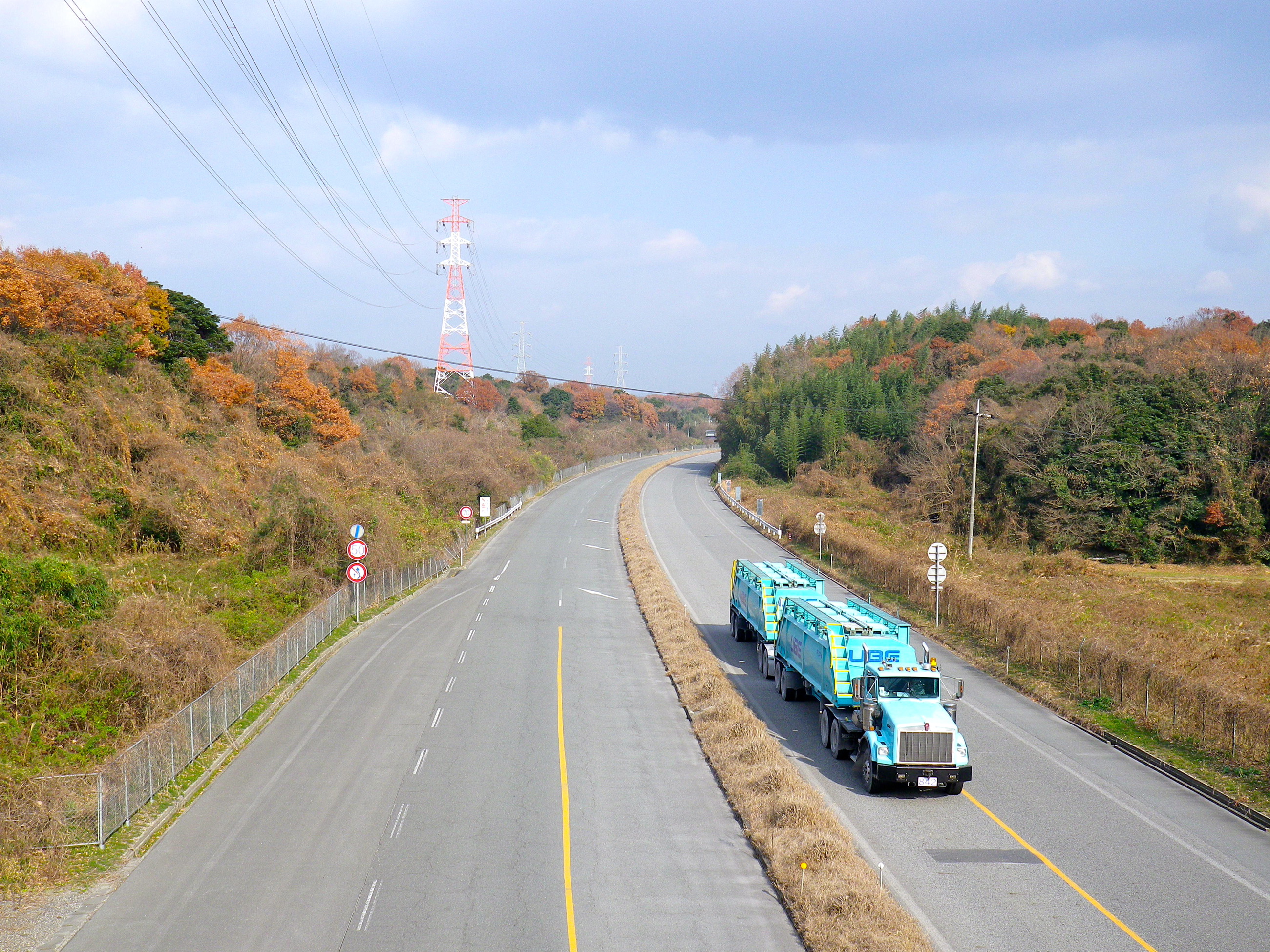
A Kenworth with A-double chemical carrying trailers on a UBE Industries mining expressway in Japan

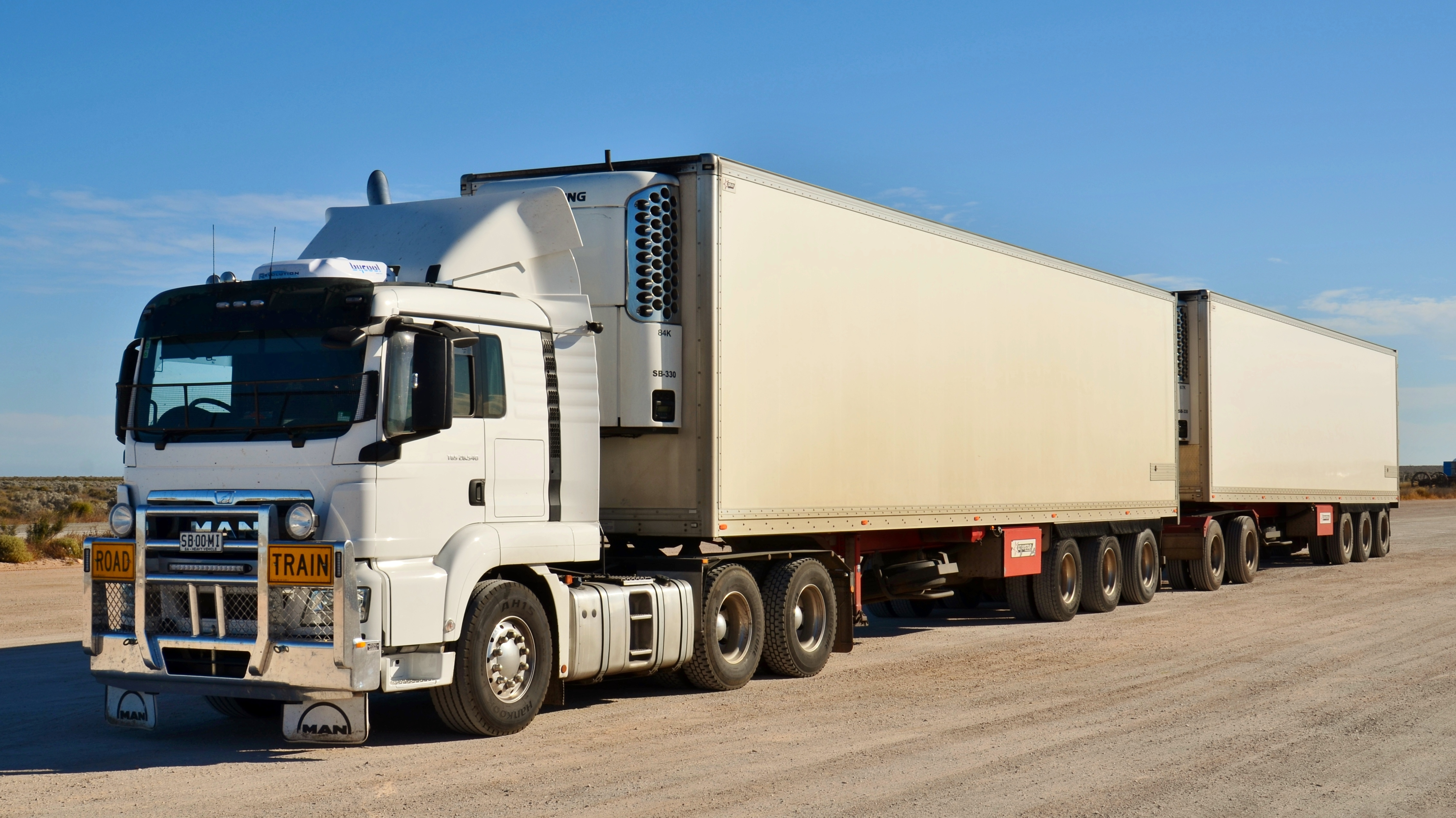
A MAN with A-double in Australia

An A-double consists of a prime mover towing a normal lead trailer with a towing hitch such as a Ringfeder coupling affixed to it at the rear. A fifth wheel dolly is then affixed to the hitch allowing another standard trailer to be attached. Eleven-axle coal tipping sets carrying to Port Kembla, Australia are described as A-doubles. The set depicted has a tare weight of 35.5 t (39.1 short tons) and is capable of carrying 50 t (55.1 short tons) of coal. Note the shield at the front of the second trailer to direct tipped coal from the first trailer downwards. A-double road trains can utilize either tandem axle dollies or tri (three) axle dollies to connect the second trailer to the first.

Pros include the ability to use standard semi-trailers and the potential for very large loads. Cons mainly include very tricky reversing due to the multiple articulation points across two different types of coupling.

=== B-double ===
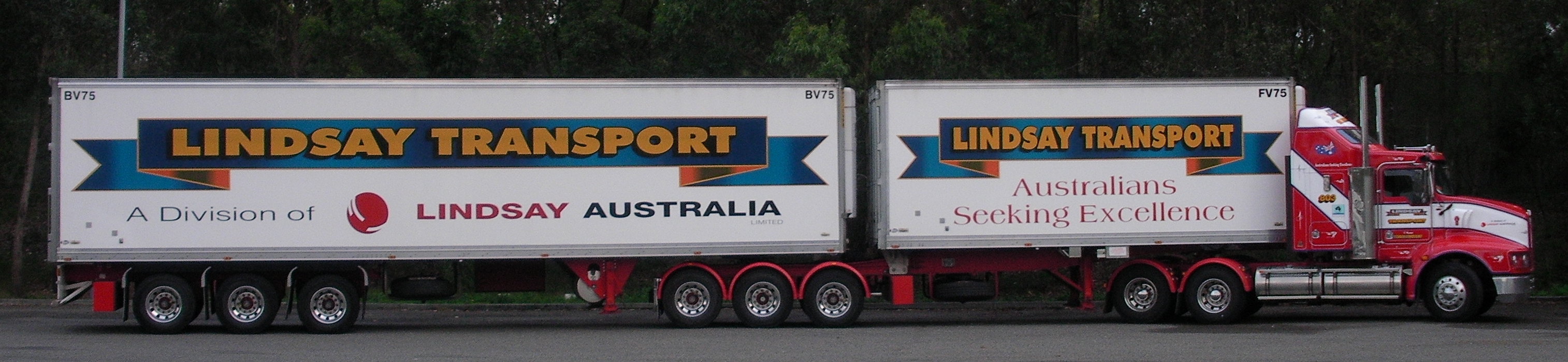
A B-double parked at a truck stop in New South Wales, Australia

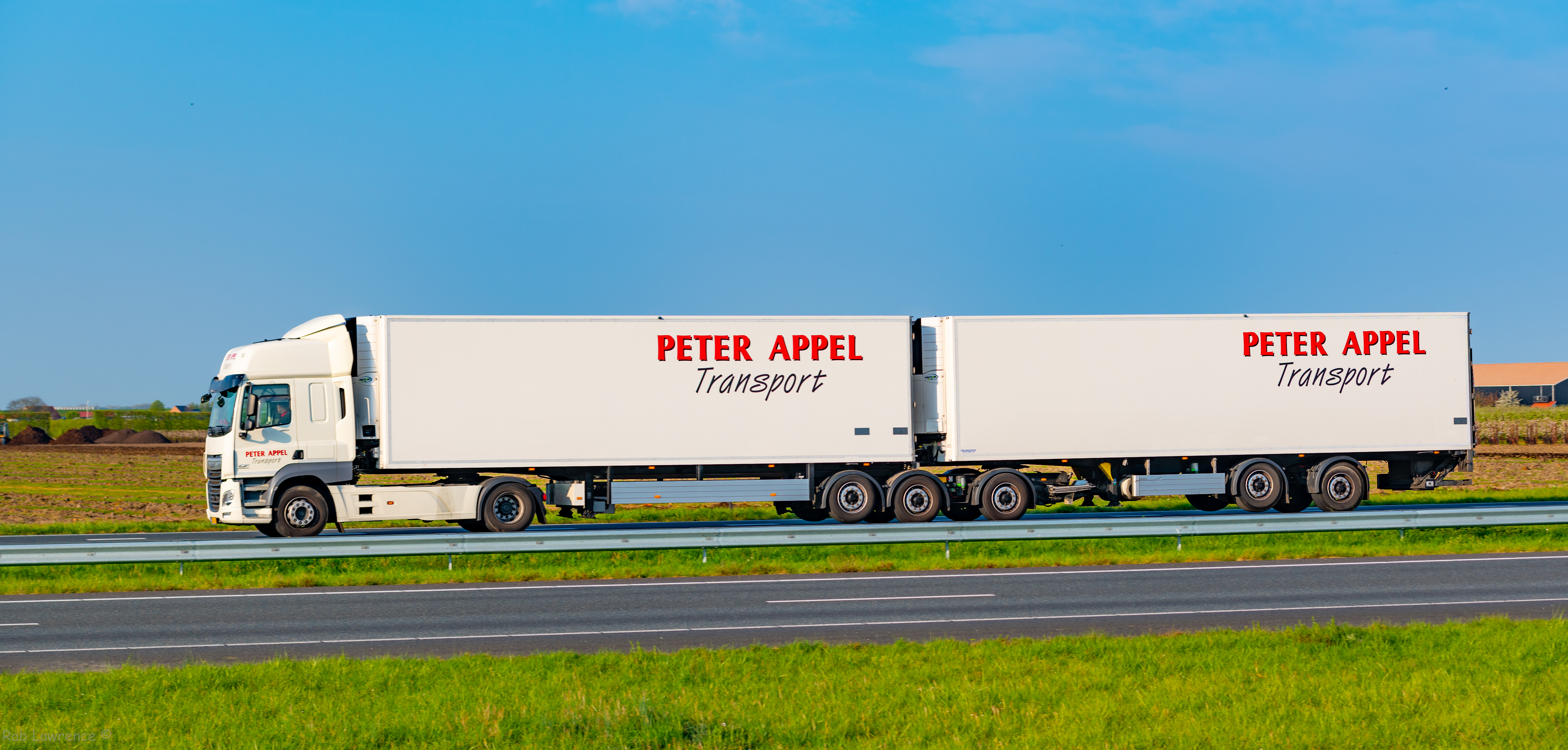
A 25.25 metre B-double consisting of two trailers with the same length in the Netherlands

A B-double consists of a prime mover towing a specialised lead trailer that has a fifth-wheel mounted on the rear towing an ordinary semi-trailer, resulting in two articulation points. It may also be known as a B-train, interlink in South Africa, B-double in Australia, tandem tractor-trailer, tandem rig, or double in North America. They may typically be up to 27.5 m (90 ft 3 in) long. The fifth wheel coupling is located at the rear of the lead (first) trailer and is mounted on a "tail" section commonly located immediately above the lead trailer axles. In North America this area of the lead trailer is often referred to as the "bridge". The twin-trailer assembly is hooked up to a tractor unit via the tractor unit's fifth wheel in the customary manner.

An advantage of the B-train configuration is its inherent stability when compared to most other twin trailer combinations, as the turntable mounted on the forward trailer results in the B-train not requiring a converter dolly as with all other road train configurations. Also, reversing is simpler because all articulation points are on fifth wheel couplings. These properties have ensured its continued development and global acceptance.

B-train trailers are used to transport many types of load and examples include tanks for liquid and dry-bulk, flat-beds and curtain-siders for deck-loads, bulkers for aggregates and wood residuals, refrigerated trailers for chilled and frozen goods, vans for dry goods, logging trailers for forestry work and cattle liners for livestock.

In Australia, standard semi-trailers are permitted on almost every road. B-doubles are more heavily regulated, but routes are made available by state governments for almost anywhere that significant road freight movement is required.

Around container ports in Australia exists what is known as a super B-double; a B-double with an extra axle (total of 4) on the lead trailer and either three or four axle set on the rear trailer. This allows the super B-Double to carry combinations of two 40 foot containers, four 20 foot containers, or a combination of one 40 foot container and two twenty foot containers. However, because of their length and low accessibility into narrow streets, these vehicles are restricted in where they can go and are generally used for terminal-to-terminal work, i.e. wharf to container holding park or wharf-to-wharf. The rear axle on each trailer can also pivot slightly while turning to prevent scrubbing out the edges of the tyres due to the heavy loads placed on them.

=== B-triple ===
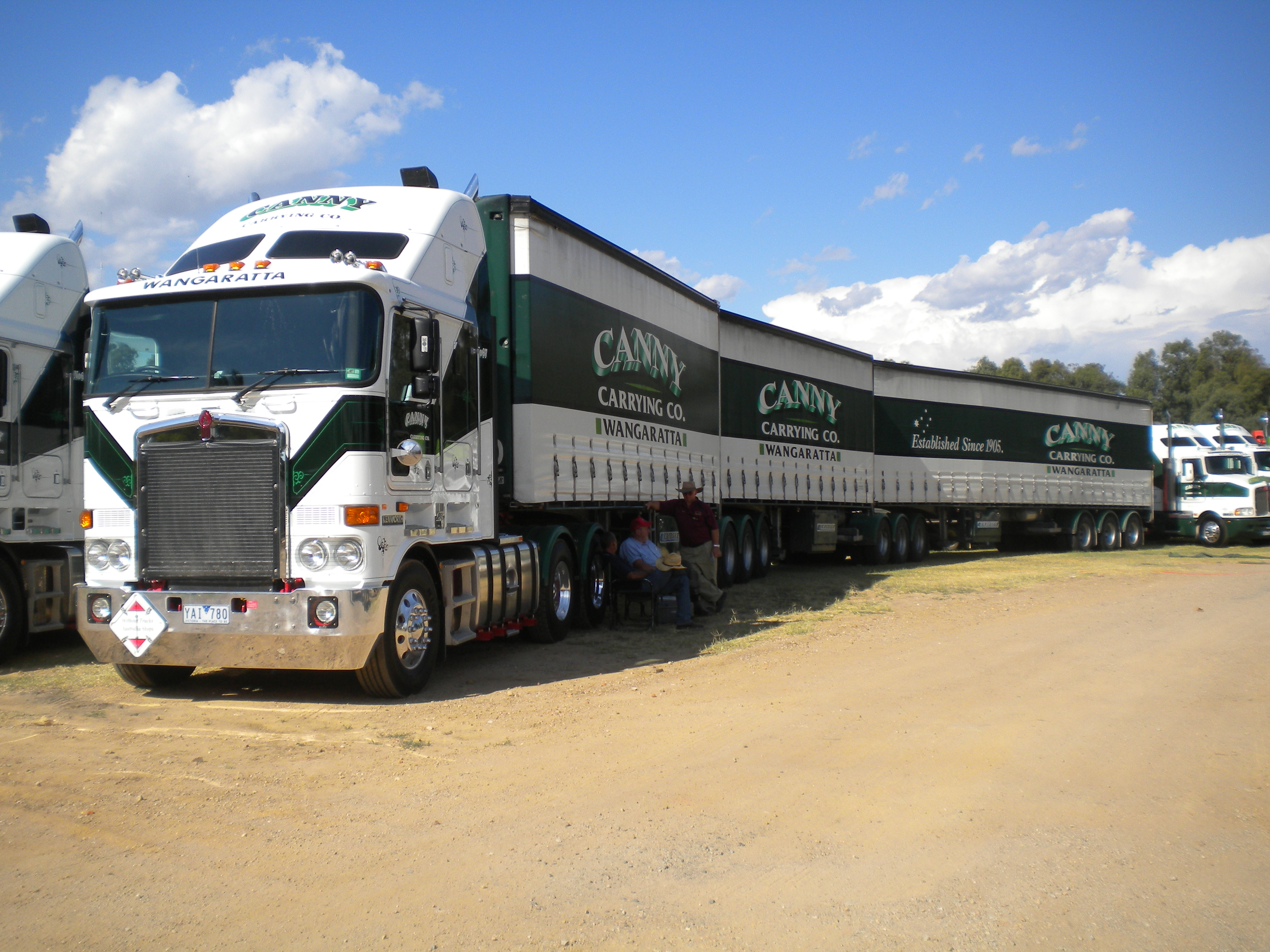
B-triple

Essentially a B-double arrangement with a second lead trailer attached to the first, and an ordinary trailer attached to the second bridge trailer. The B-train principle has been exploited in Australia, where configurations such as B triples, double-B doubles and 2AB quads are permitted on some routes. These are run in most states of Australia where double road trains are allowed. Australia's National Transport Commission proposed a national framework for B-triple operations that includes basic vehicle specifications and operating conditions that the commission anticipates will replace the current state-by-state approach, which largely discourages the use of B-triples for interstate operation. In South Australia, B-triples up to 35.0 metres (114 ft 10 in) and two-trailer road trains to 36.5 metres (119 ft 9 in) are generally permitted only on specified routes, including access to industrial and export areas near Port Adelaide from the north.

In New South Wales, B-Triples are classified between modular B-Triples and non-modular B-Triples. Modular B-Triples are limited to a maximum length of 35.0 metres (114 ft 10 in) but more importantly, the combination must be able to form a compliant B-Double with a maximum length of 26.0 metres by removing any one of its three semitrailers. On the other hand, non-modular B Triples can be up to 36.5 metres (119 ft 9 in) in length and have no restrictions on the relative size of each of its three trailers.

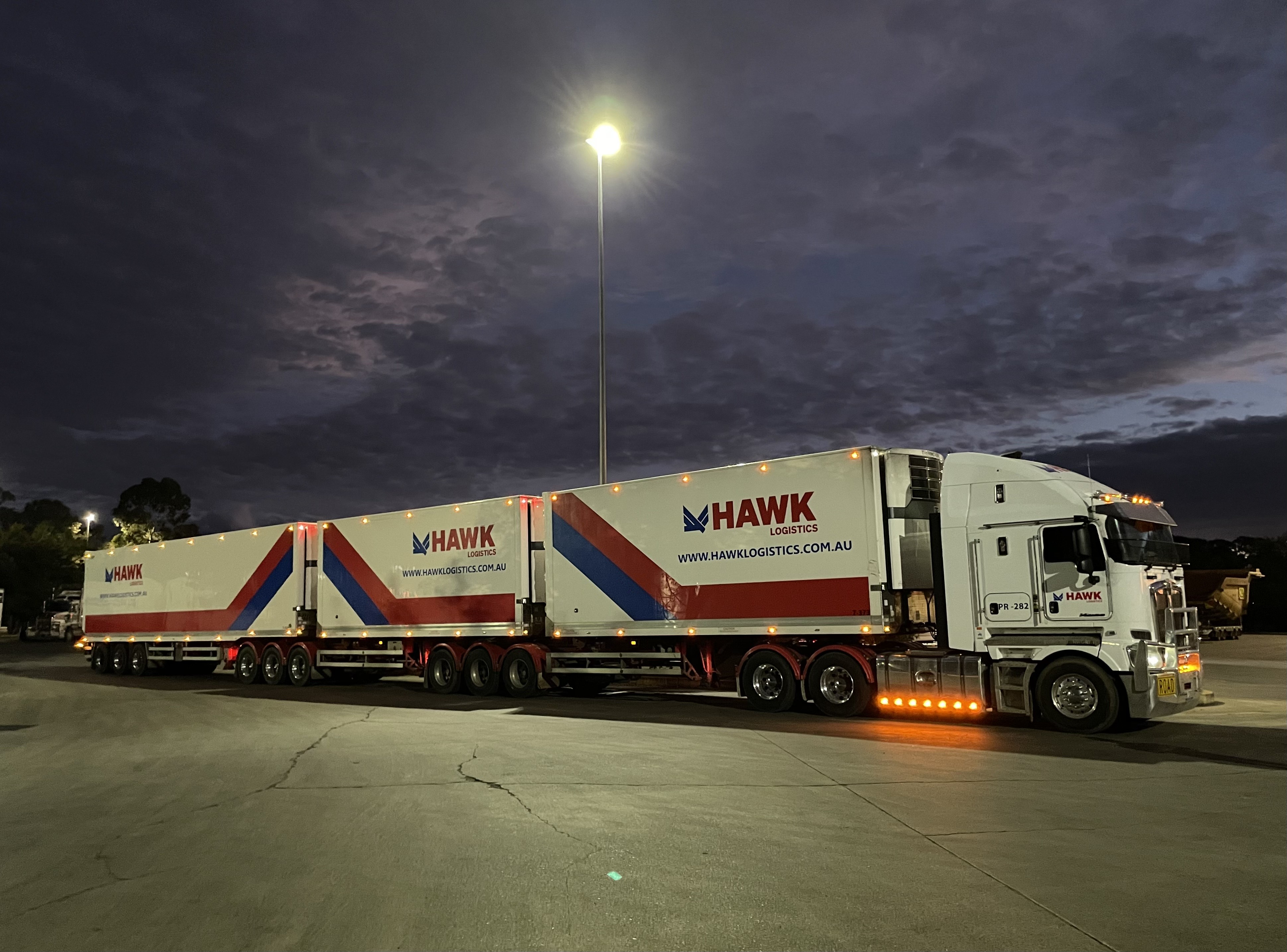
Modular B-Triple with equally sized lead trailers.

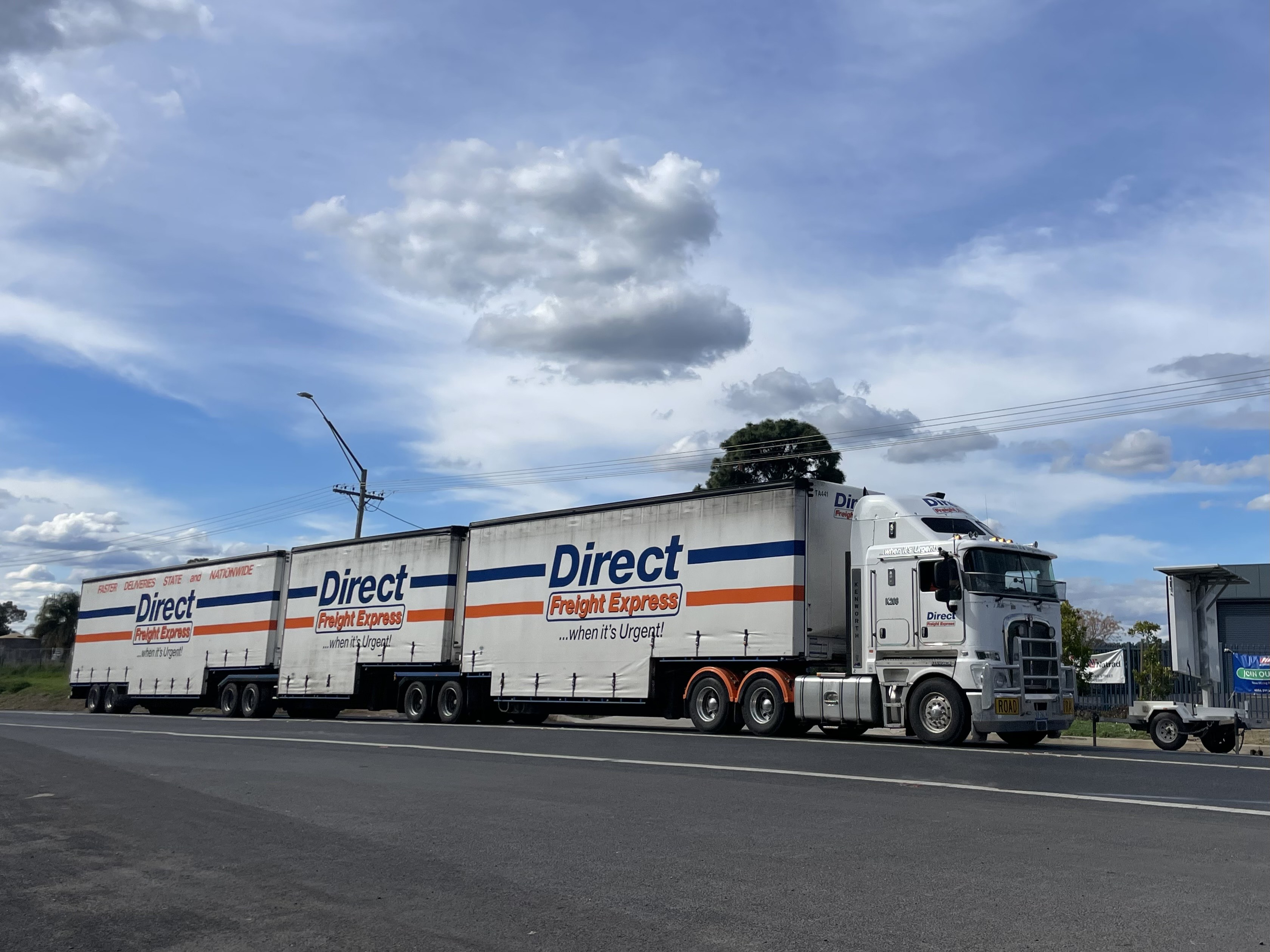
An example of a non-modular B triple, with the lead trailer being significantly longer than the middle trailer.

=== B quad ===
Beginning in 2018, the B quad has been allowed in Victoria, New South Wales, and Queensland.

=== AB-Triple ===
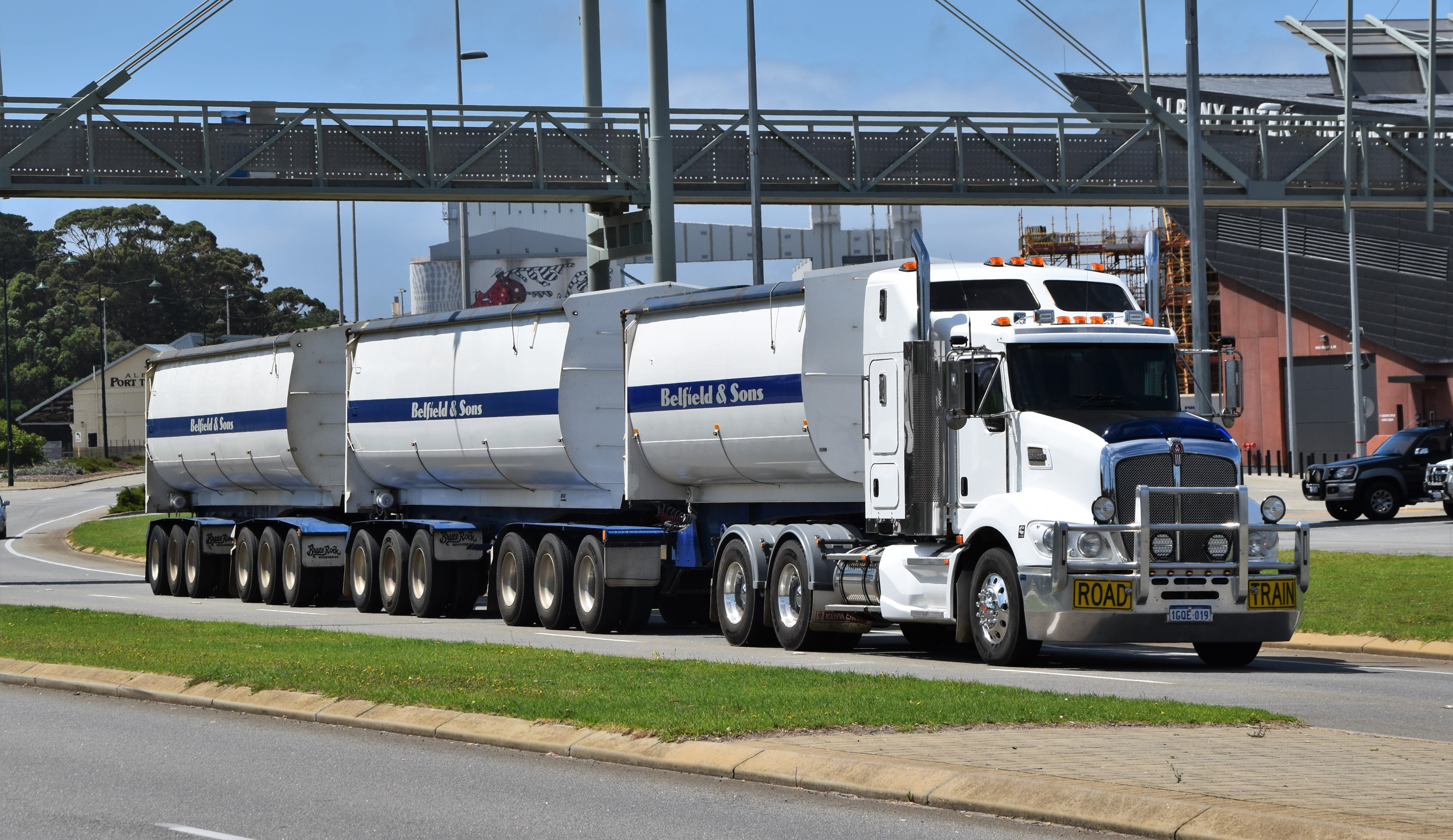
BA-triple

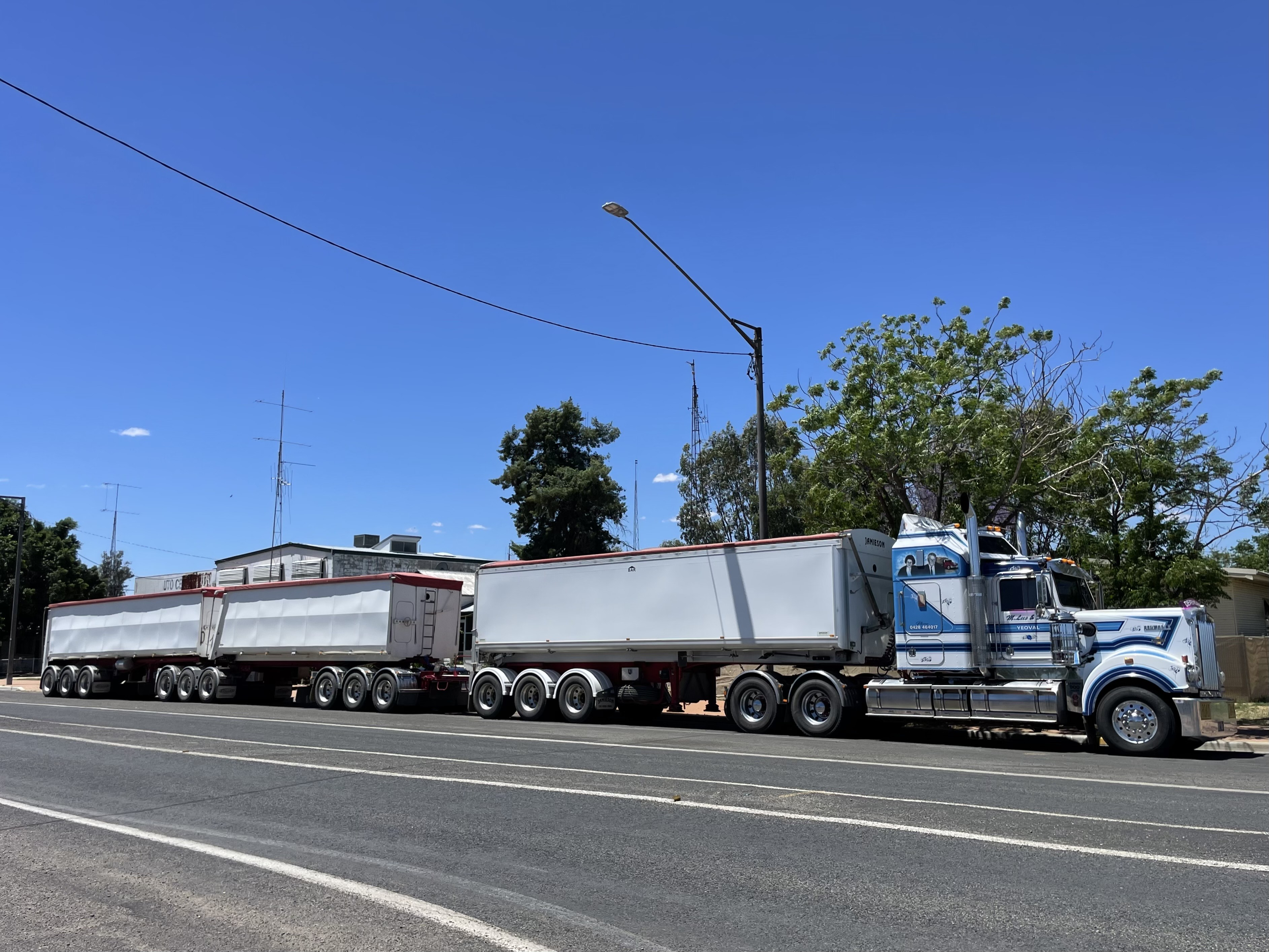
AB-Triple configuration with a tri-axle dolly in Walgett, New South Wales.

An AB triple consists of a standard trailer with a B-Double behind it using a converter dolly, with a trailer order of Standard, Dolly, B-Train, Standard. The final trailer may be either a B-Train with no trailer attached to it or a standard trailer. Alternatively, a BA triple sees this configuration reversed, consisting of a B-double with a converter dolly and standard trailer behind it.

=== A-triple ===
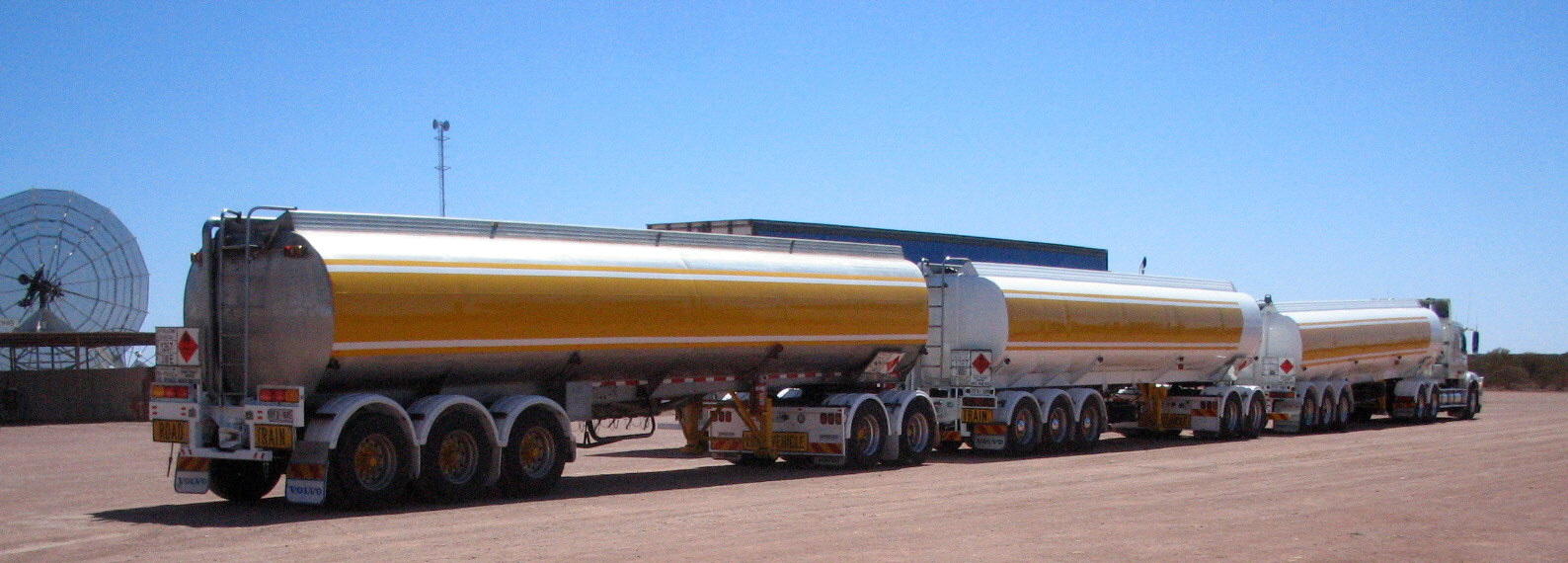
A-triple as tanker hauler

In South Australia, larger road trains up to 53.5 metres (175 ft 6 in) (three full trailers) are permitted only on certain routes in the Far North.

=== BAB quad ===
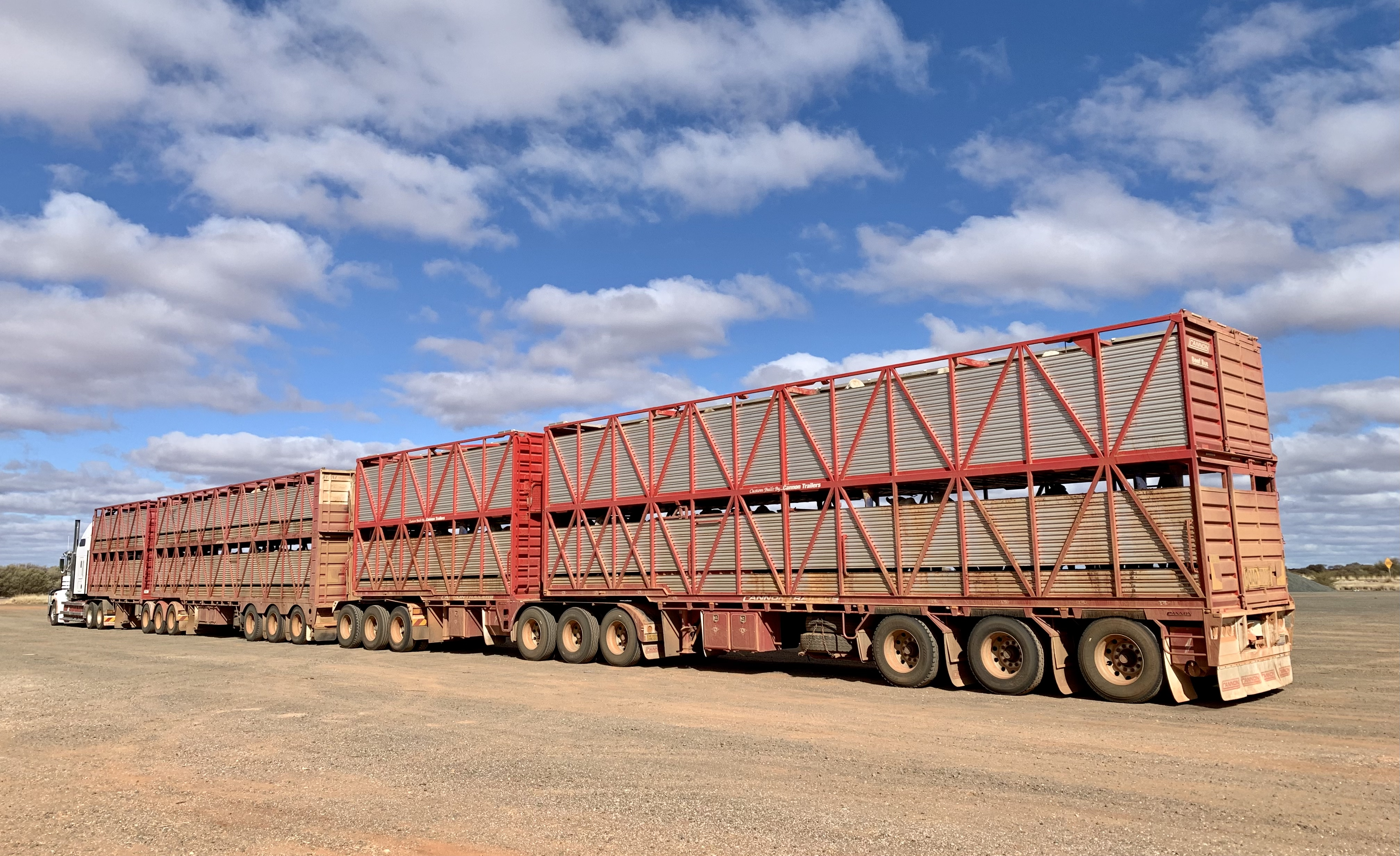
BAB quad

A BAB quad consists of two B-double units linked with a converter dolly, with trailer order of Prime Mover, B-Train, Dolly, B-Train.

=== ABB quad ===
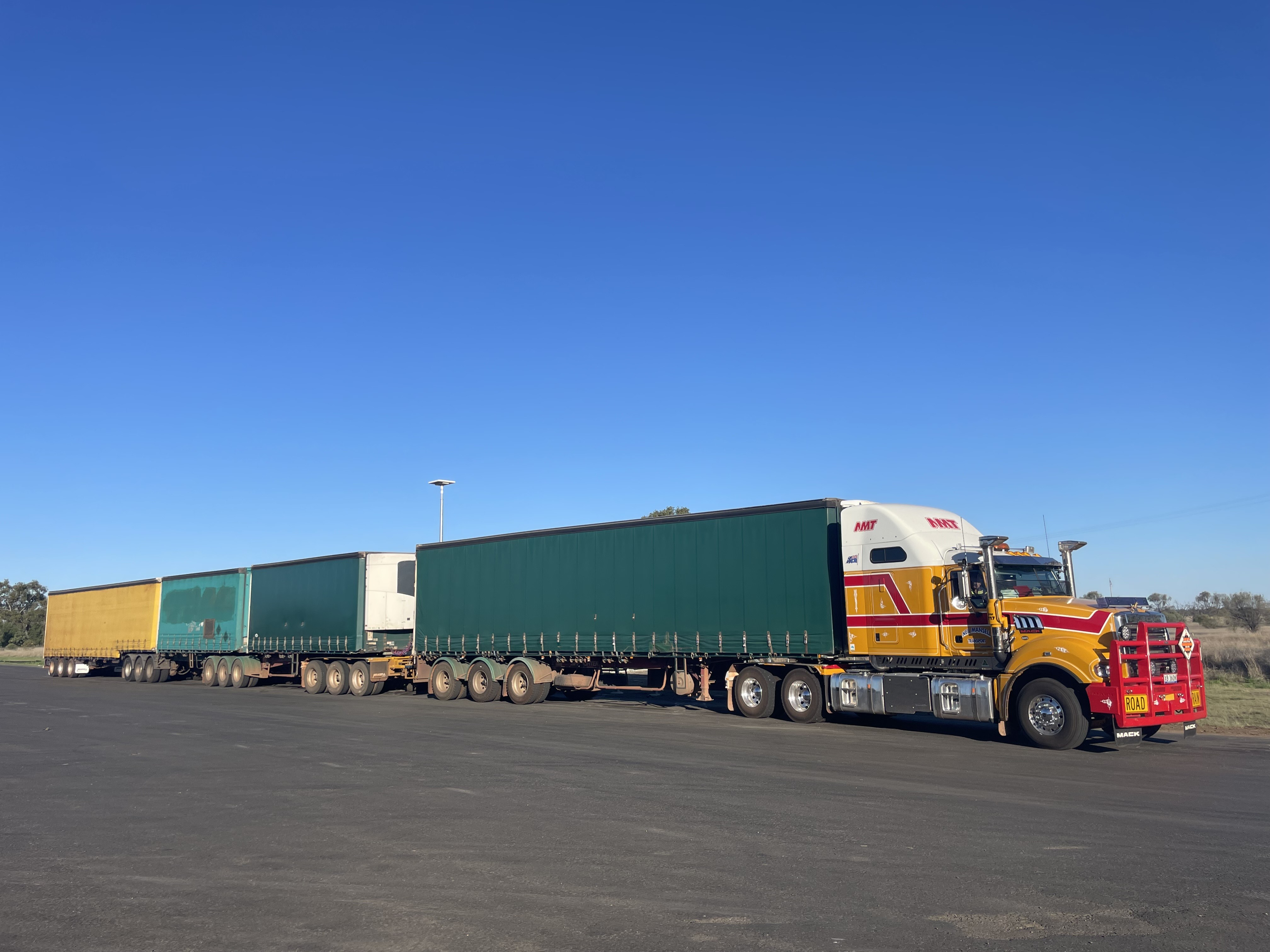
ABB Quad in Roma, Queensland

ABB quad consists of one standard trailer and B-triple units linked with a converter dolly.

=== AAB quad ===
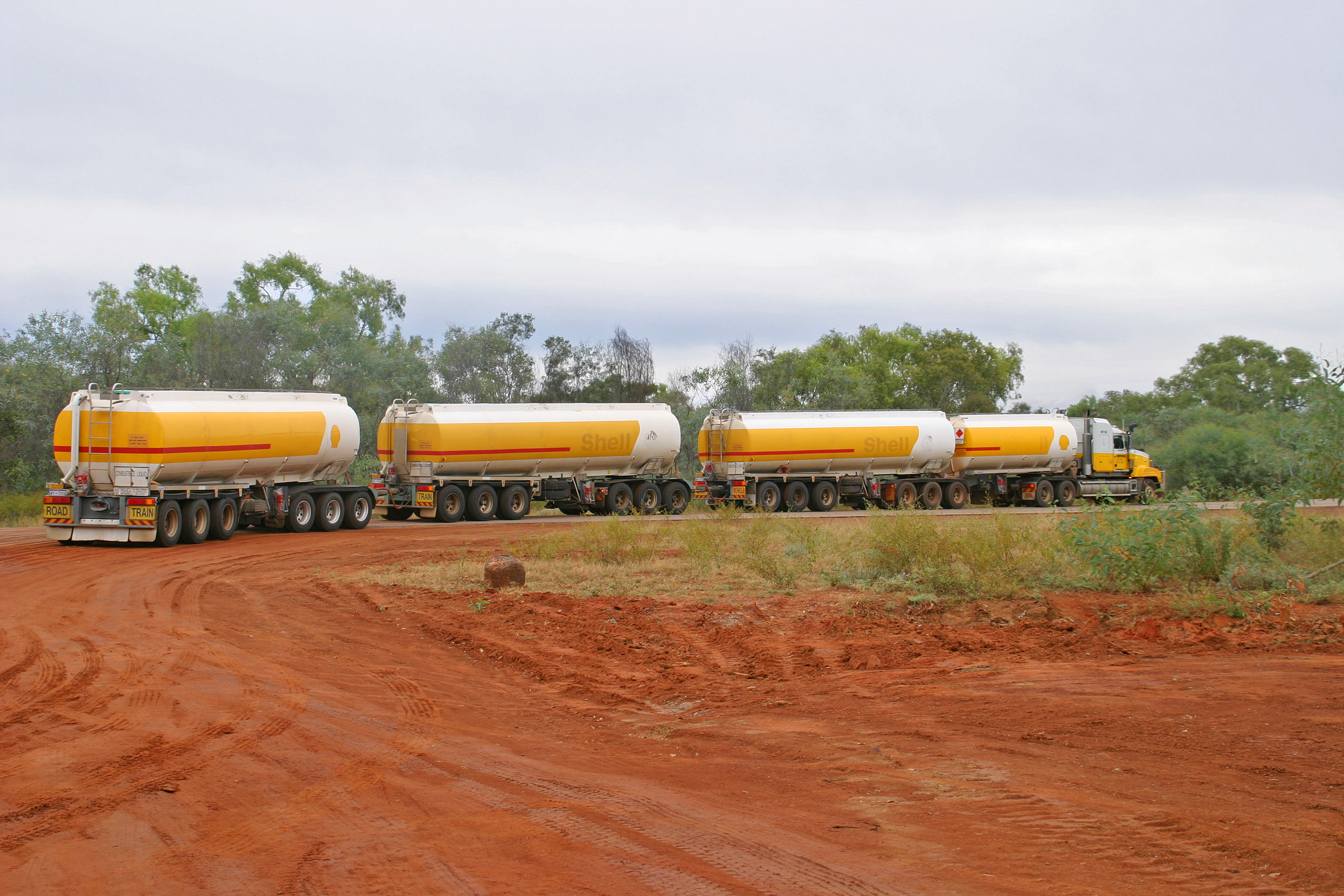
BAA quad

AAB quad consists of A-double and B-double units linked with a converter dolly. Alternatively, a BAA quad sees this configuration reversed, first the B-double, then the A-double.

=== A quad ===
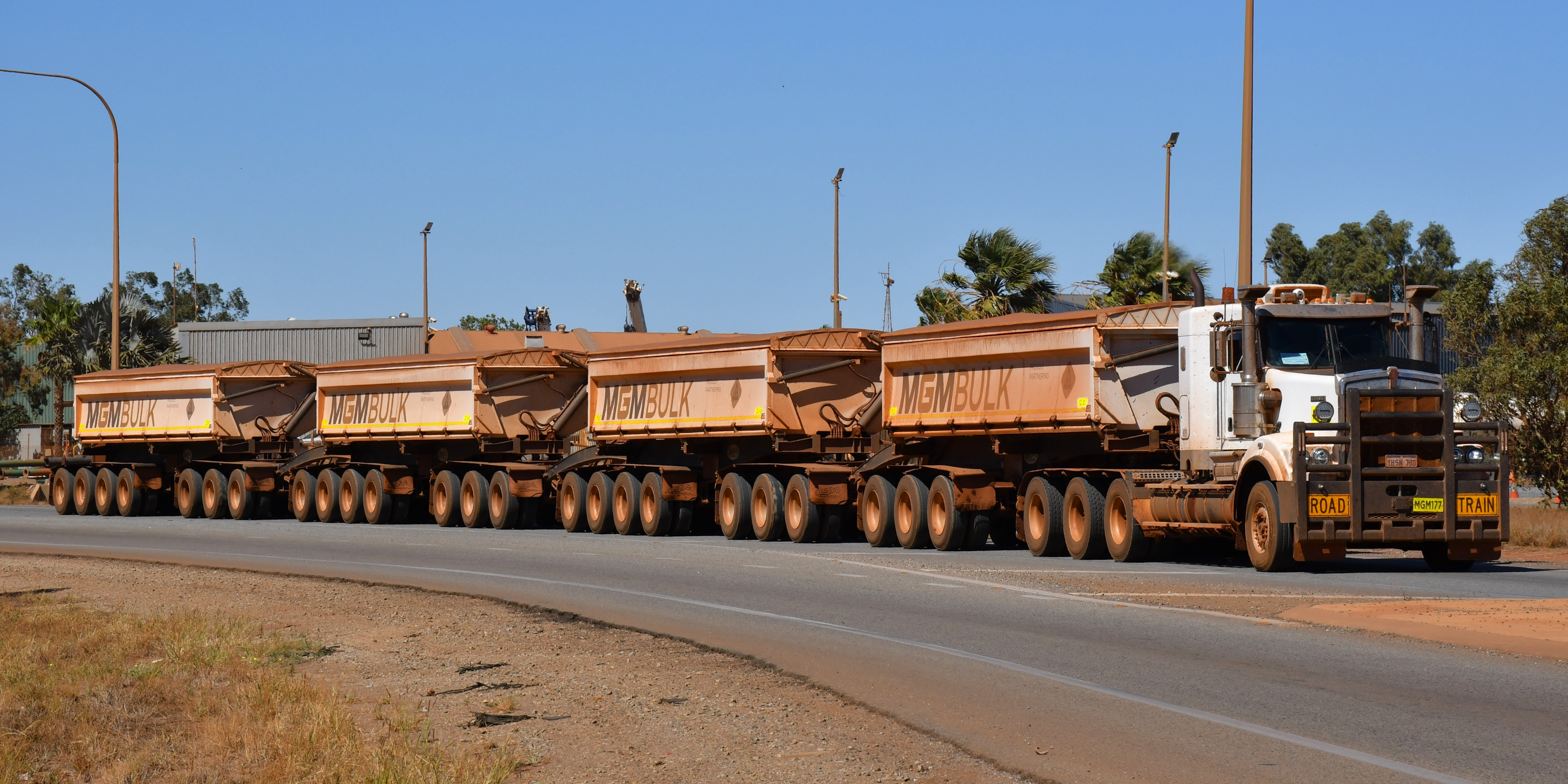
A 60-metre A quad

In some parts of Australia, 'super quad' road trains up to 60 metres (196 ft 10 in) are permitted, consisting of four standard trailers connected via three converter dollies, with a 196 tonne gross mass and 140 tonne payload.

=== C-train ===
A C-train is a semi-trailer attached to a turn table on a C-dolly. Unlike in an A-Train, the C-dolly is connected to the tractor or another trailer in front of it with two drawbars, thus eliminating the drawbar connection as an articulation point. One of the axles on a C-dolly is self-steerable to prevent tire scrubbing. C-dollies are not permitted in Australia, due to the lack of articulation.

=== Dog-trailer (dog trailer) ===
A dog-trailer (also called a pup) is a short trailer with a permanent dolly, with a single A-frame drawbar that fits into the Ringfeder or pintle hook on the rear of the truck or trailer in front, giving the whole unit two or more articulation points and very little roll stiffness. These are commonly used in Australia, particularly for end tipper applications like shown above. They are normally limited to a single dog trailer behind a short bodied (independently load carrying) truck with a standard length limit of 19 metres (20 under design permits). A quad dog trailer in combination with a bodied truck is able to carry more weight than a truck and single semi-trailer of the same length limit and access restrictions, as well as carrying two different materials as separate loads, such as with tipper bodies and fluid tankers.

=== Truck and Double Dogs ===
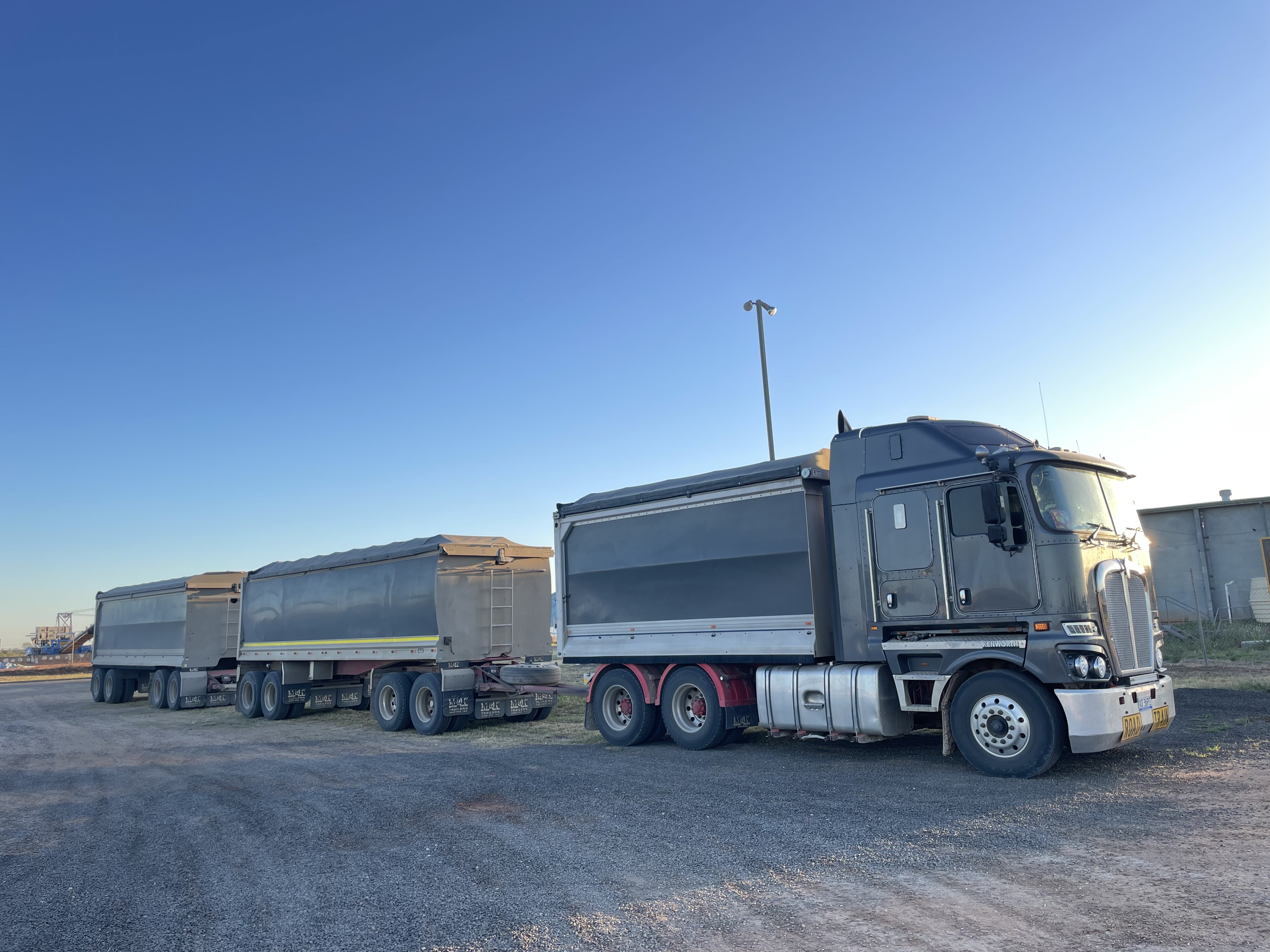
Example of a Truck and Double Dog (also known as a Rigid Combination).

In certain states of Australia, a road train configuration consisting of a rigid truck towing two dog trailers is recognized and permitted on certain roads. This combination is commonly known as a Rigid Combination. Its permissible length can be up to 36.5 metres (119 ft 9 in).

=== Interstate road transport registration in Australia ===
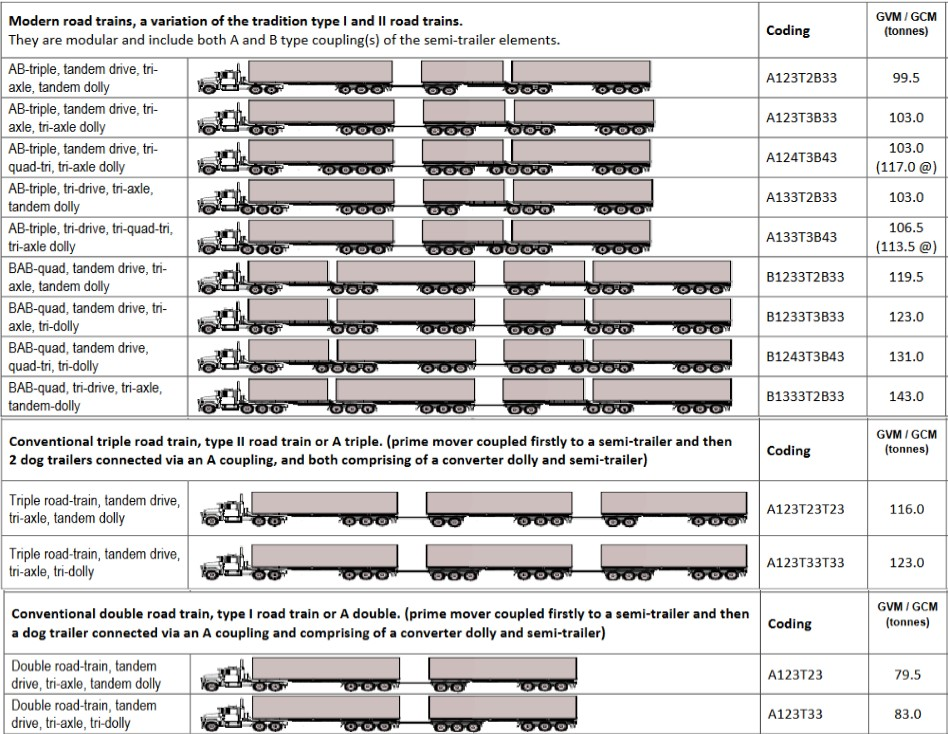
Versions of Australian road trains

In 1991, at a special Premiers' Conference, Australian heads of government signed an inter-governmental agreement to establish a national heavy vehicle registration, regulation and charging scheme: the Federal Interstate Registration Scheme (FIRS). Its requirements are as follows:

- If the vehicle was purchased to be used for interstate trade, no stamp duty is payable on the purchase price of the vehicle.
- The vehicle has to be subjected to an annual inspection for roadworthy standards.
- Registration requires the first letter of the six-digit to identify the home state or territory: A, Australian Capital Territory; N, New South Wales; C, Northern Territory; Q, Queensland; S, South Australia; T, Tasmania; V, Victoria; and W, Western Australia.

Due to the "eastern" and "western" mass limits in Australia, two different categories of registration were enacted. The second digit of the registration plate showed what mass limit was allowed for that vehicle. If a vehicle had a 'V' as the second letter, its mass limits were in line with the eastern states mass limits, which were:

- Steer axle, 1 axle, 2 tyres: 5.40 t (5.31 long tons; 5.95 short tons)
- Steer axle, 2 axles, 2 tyres per axle: Non load sharing suspension 9.00 t (8.86 long tons; 9.92 short tons)
  - Load sharing suspension 10.00 t (9.84 long tons; 11.02 short tons)
- Single axle, dual tyres: 8.50 t (8.37 long tons; 9.37 short tons)
- Tandem axle, dual tyres: 15.00 t (14.76 long tons; 16.53 short tons)
- Tri-axle, dual tyres or 'super single' tyres: 18.00 t (17.72 long tons; 19.84 short tons)
- Gross combination mass on a 6-axle vehicle not to exceed 38 t (37 long tons; 42 short tons)

If a vehicle had an X as the second letter, its mass limits were in line with the western states mass limits, which were:

- Steer axle, 1 axle, 2 tyres: 6.00 t (5.91 long tons; 6.61 short tons)
- Steer axle, 2 axles, 2 tyres per axle
  - Non load sharing suspension 10.00 t (9.84 long tons; 11.02 short tons): Load sharing suspension 11.00 t (10.83 long tons; 12.13 short tons)
- Single axle, dual tyres: 9.00 t (8.86 long tons; 9.92 short tons)
- Tandem axle, dual tyres: 16.50 t (16.24 long tons; 18.19 short tons)
- Tri-axle, dual tyres or "super single" tyres: 20.00 t (19.68 long tons; 22.05 short tons)
- Gross combination mass on a 6-axle vehicle not to exceed 42.50 t (41.83 long tons; 46.85 short tons)

The second digit of the registration being a T designates a trailer.

One of the main criteria of the registration is that intrastate operation is not permitted. The load has to come from one state or territory and be delivered to another. Many grain carriers were reported and prosecuted for cartage from the paddock to the silos. However, if the load went to a port silo, they were given the benefit of the doubt, as that grain was more than likely to be going overseas.

=== Signage ===
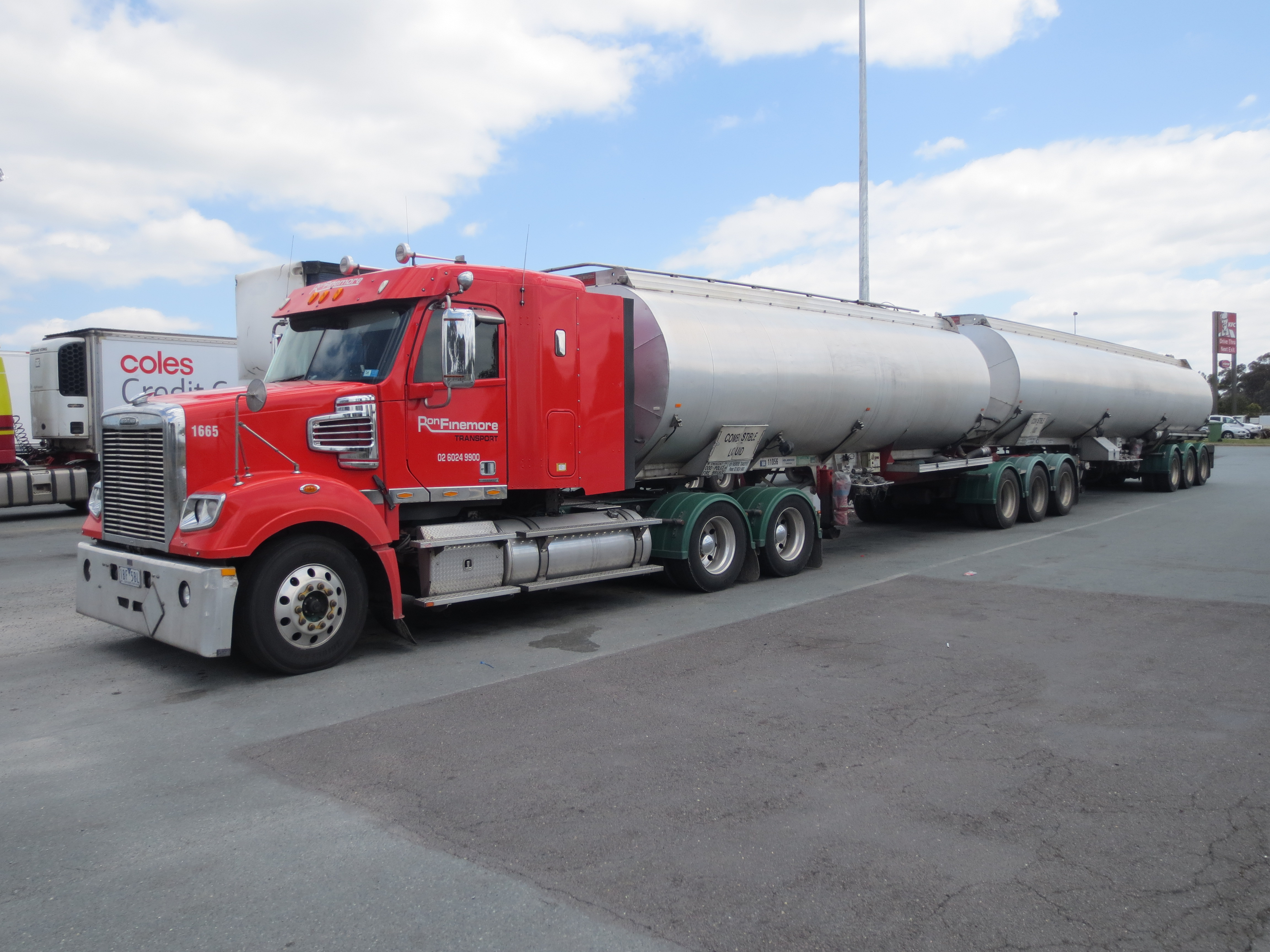
B-double

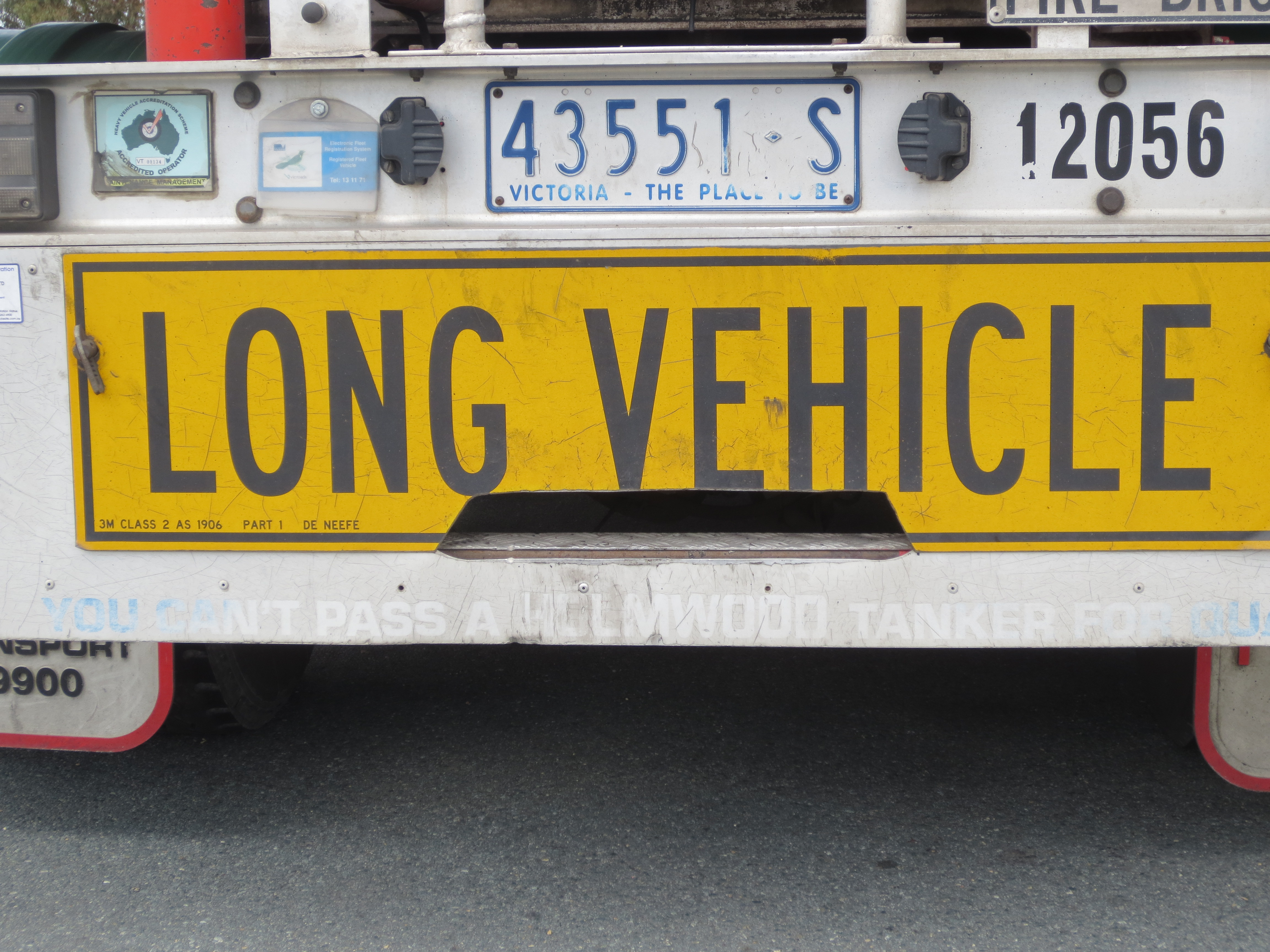
"Long Vehicle" sign located on the rear bumper

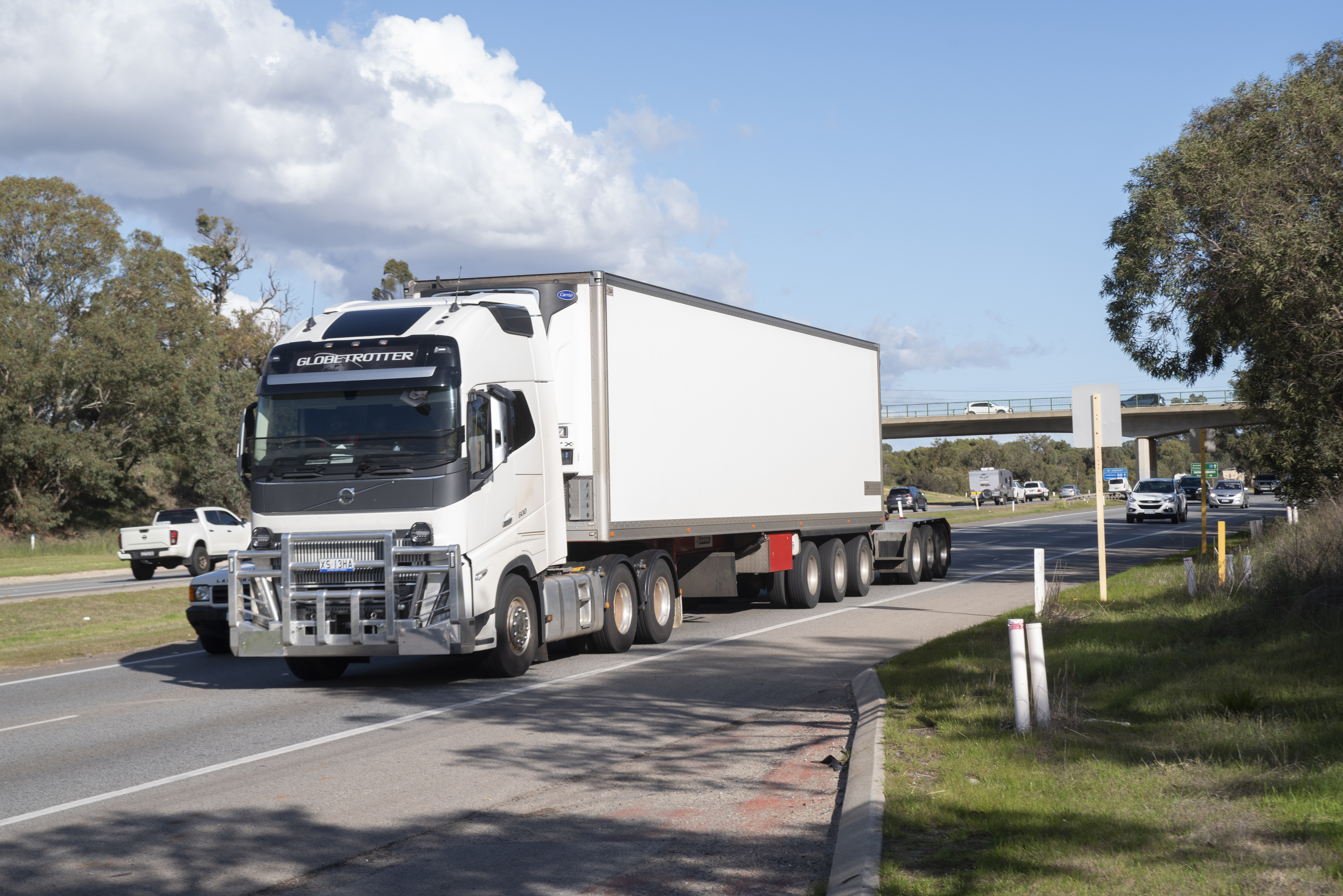
Single dolly behind a trailer

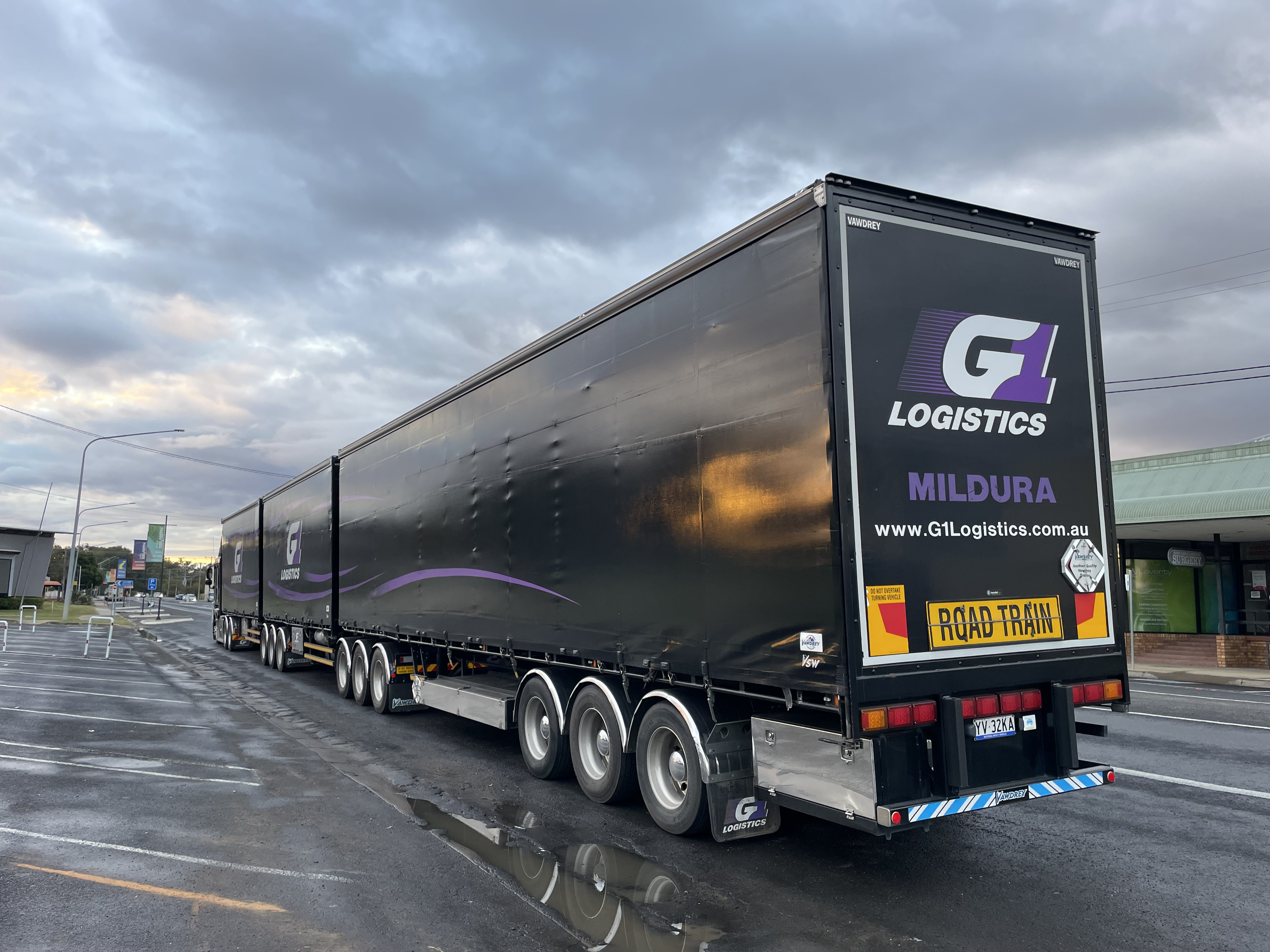
"Road Train" sign displayed on the third trailer of a B-Triple road train

Australian road trains have horizontal signs front and back with 180 mm (7.1 in) high black uppercase letters on a reflective yellow background reading "ROAD TRAIN". The sign(s) must have a black border and be at least 1.02 m (3.3 ft) long and 220 mm (8.7 in) high and be placed between 500 mm (19.7 in) and 1.8 m (5.9 ft) above the ground on the fore or rearmost surface of the unit.

In the case of B-triples in Western Australia, they are signed front and rear with "ROAD TRAIN" until they cross the WA/SA border where they are then signed with "LONG VEHICLE" in the front and rear.

Converter dollies must have a sign affixed horizontally to the rearmost point, complying to the same conditions, reading "LONG VEHICLE". This is required for when a dolly is towed behind a trailer.

In accordance with NHVR (National Heavy Vehicle Regulator) requirements, Long Vehicle signs must be displayed at the rear of every combination that is longer than 22m (72 ft 2 in) but no longer than 30m (98 ft 5 in). All combinations longer than 30m, irrespective of trailer configuration, are required to display "Road Train" signs at the front and rear of the vehicle, that is the prime mover and the rear of the last trailer in the combination.

=== Combination lengths ===
B-double
26 m (85.3 ft) max. Western Australia, 27.5 m (90.2 ft) max.
B-triple
up to 36.5 m (120 ft) max.
NTC modular B-triple
35.0 m (115 ft) max. (uses 2× conventional B-double lead trailers)
Pocket road train
27.5 m (90.2 ft) max. (Western Australia only) This configuration is classed as a "Long Vehicle".
Double road train or AB road train
36.5 m (120 ft) max.
Triple and ABB or BAB-quad road trains
53.5 m (176 ft) max.

=== Operating weights ===
Operational weights are based on axle group masses, as follows:

Single axle (steer tyre)
6.0 t (5.9 long tons; 6.6 short tons)
Single axle (steer axle with 'super single' tyres)
6.7 t (6.6 long tons; 7.4 short tons)
Single axle (dual tyres)
9.0 t (8.9 long tons; 9.9 short tons)
Tandem axle grouping
16.5 t (16.2 long tons; 18.2 short tons)
Tri-axle grouping
20.0 t (19.7 long tons; 22.0 short tons)

Therefore,

- A B-double (single axle steering, tandem drive, and two tri-axle groups) would have an operational weight of 62.5 t (61.5 long tons; 68.9 short tons).
- A double road train (single axle steering, tandem drive, tri-axle, tandem, tri-axle) would have an operational weight of 79 t (78 long tons; 87 short tons).
- A triple is 115.5 t (113.68 long tons; 127.32 short tons).
- Quads weigh in at 135.5 t (133.4 long tons; 149.4 short tons).
- Concessional weight limits, which increase allowable weight to accredited operators can see (for example) a quad weighing up to 149 t (147 long tons; 164 short tons).
- If a tri-drive prime mover is utilised, along with tri-axle dollies, weights can reach nearly 170 t (167 long tons; 187 short tons).

=== Speed limits ===
The Australian national heavy vehicle speed limit is 100 km/h (62 mph), except in New South Wales and Queensland where the speed limit for any road train is 90 km/h (56 mph). B triple road trains have a speed limit of 100 km/h (62 mph) in Queensland.

In Canada, there is no difference between the cars' and road trains' speed limits, which range from 80 to 100 km/h (50 to 62 mph) on two-lane roads and 100 to 110 km/h (62 to 68 mph) on three-lane roads.

In Europe, the speed limit for heavy goods trucks is usually 80 km/h (50 mph). Heavy trucks are required to have speed limiters, making it impossible to drive them faster than 90 km/h (56 mph). These limits are normally the same for road trains. Trucks are discouraged from overtaking slightly slower vehicles on motorways because doing so obstructs the left lane, although such overtaking is still common, e.g. when heavy road trains lose speed uphill.

== World's longest road trains ==
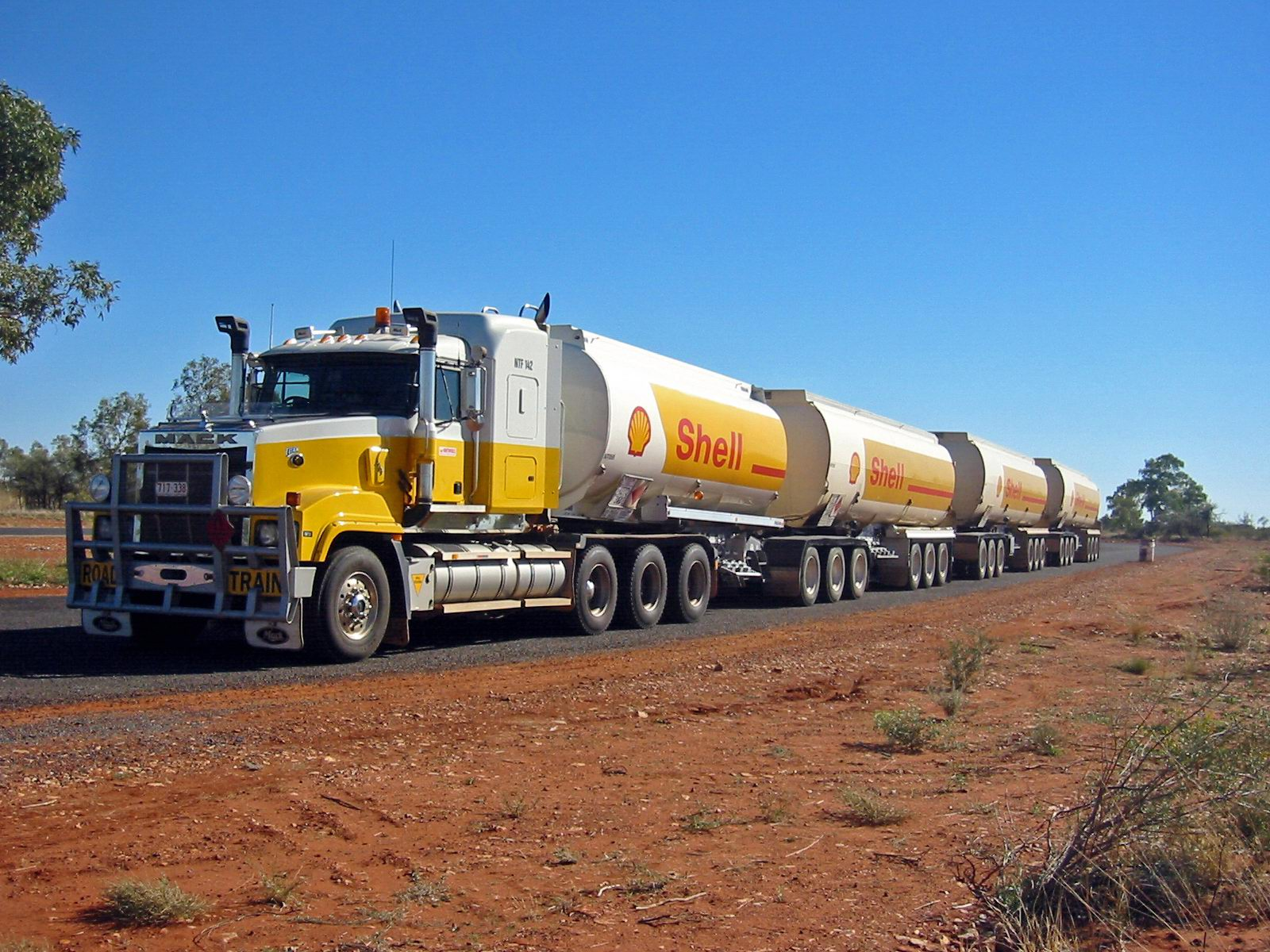
Shell Australia BAA quad tanker road train in the Northern Territory. Trailer arrangement is B-double towing two tri-axle trailers.

Below is a list of the longest road trains in the world. Most of these had no practical use, as they were driven across relatively short distances for the express purpose of record-breaking.

- In 1989, a trucker named "Buddo" tugged 12 trailers down the main street of Winton.
- In 1993, "Plugger" Bowden took the record with a 525 hp (391 kW) Mack CLR pulling 16 trailers.
- A few months later this effort was surpassed by Darwin driver Malcolm Chisholm with a 290-tonne (285-long-ton; 320-short-ton), 21-trailer rig extending 315 metres (1,033 ft).
- In April 1994 Bob Hayward and Andrew Aichison organised another attempt using a 1988 Mack Super-Liner 500 hp V8 belonging to Plugger Bowden who drove 29 stock trailers measuring 439.169 metres a distance of 4.5 km into Bourke. The record was published in the next Guinness Book of Records.
- Then the record went back to Winton with 34 trailers.
- On 3 April 1999, the town of Merredin, officially made it into the Guinness Book of Records, when Marleys Transport made a successful attempt on the record for the world's longest road train. The record was created when 45 trailers, driven by Greg Marley, weighing 603 t (593 long tons; 665 short tons) and measuring 610 m (2,001 ft) were pulled by a Kenworth 10×6 K100G for 8 km (5 mi).
- On 19 October 2000, Doug Gould set the first of his records in Kalgoorlie, when a roadtrain made up of 79 trailers, measuring 1,018.2 m (3,341 ft) and weighing 1,072.3 t (1,055.4 long tons; 1,182.0 short tons), was pulled by a Kenworth C501T driven by Steven Matthews a distance of 8 km (5 mi).
- On 29 March 2003, the record was surpassed near Mungindi, by a road train consisting of 87 trailers and a single prime mover (measuring 1,235.3 m (4,053 ft) in length).
- The record returned to Kalgoorlie, on 17 October 2004, when Doug Gould assembled 117 trailers for a total length of 1,445 m (4,741 ft). The attempt nearly failed, as the first prime mover's main driveshaft broke when taking off. A second truck was quickly made available, and pulled the train a distance of 1,500 m (4,921 ft).
- In 2004, the record was again broken by a group from Clifton, Queensland which used a standard Mack truck to pull 120 trailers a distance of about 100 metres (328 ft).
- On 18 February 2006, an Australian-built Mack truck with 113 semi-trailers, 1,300 t (1,279 long tons; 1,433 short tons) and 1,474.3 metres (4,836 ft 11 in) long, pulled the load 100 metres (328 feet) to recapture the record for the longest road train (multiple loaded trailers) ever pulled with a single prime mover. It was on the main road of Clifton, Queensland, that 70-year-old John Atkinson claimed a new record, pulled by a tri-drive Mack Titan.

=== Outside Australia ===
- On 12 April 2016 in Gothenburg, Sweden, a Volvo FH16 750 pulled 20 trailers with double-stacked containers with a total length of 300 meters (984 ft) and with a total weight of 750 tonnes.

== Gallery ==
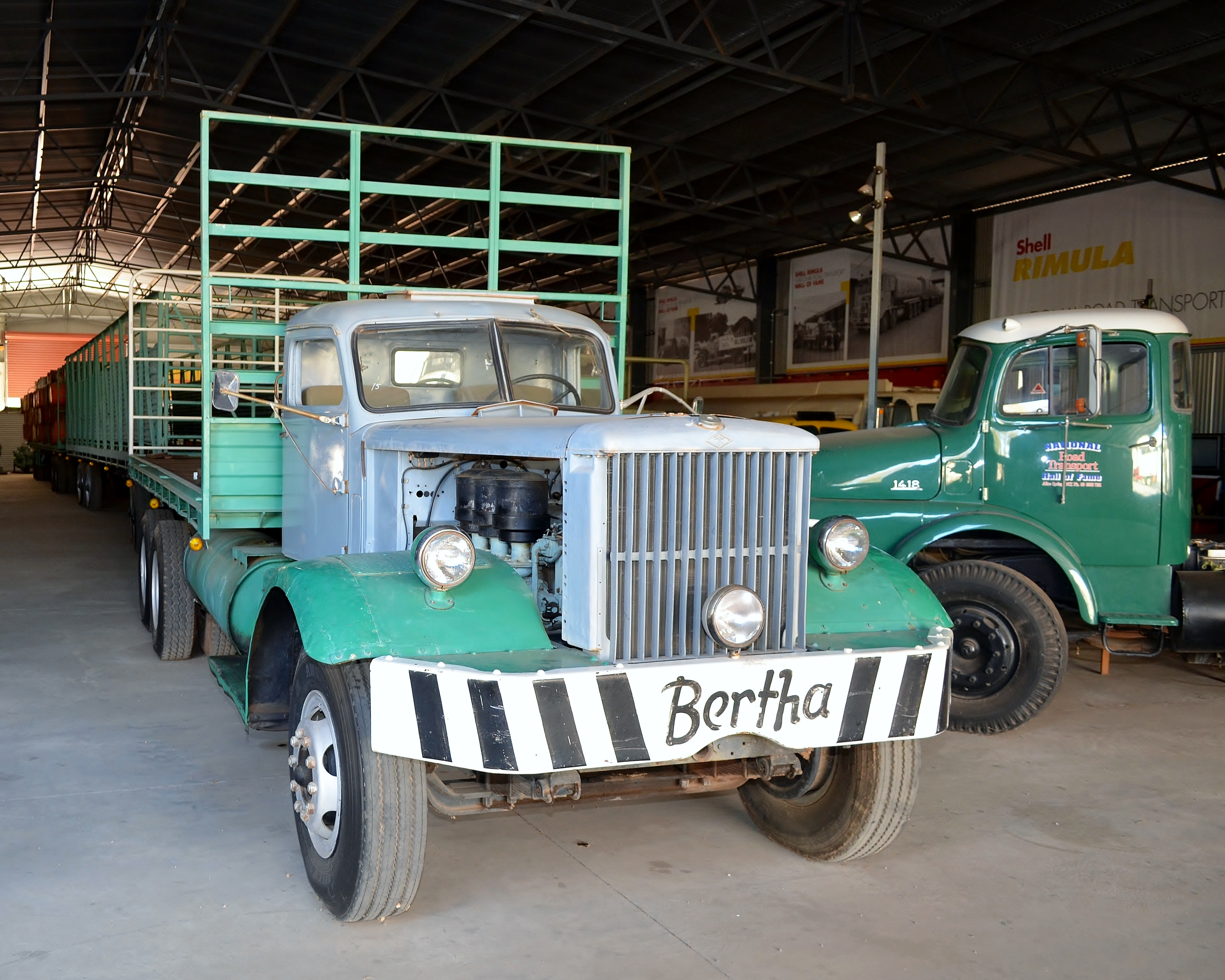
Kurt Johannsen's "Bertha" Diamond T 980

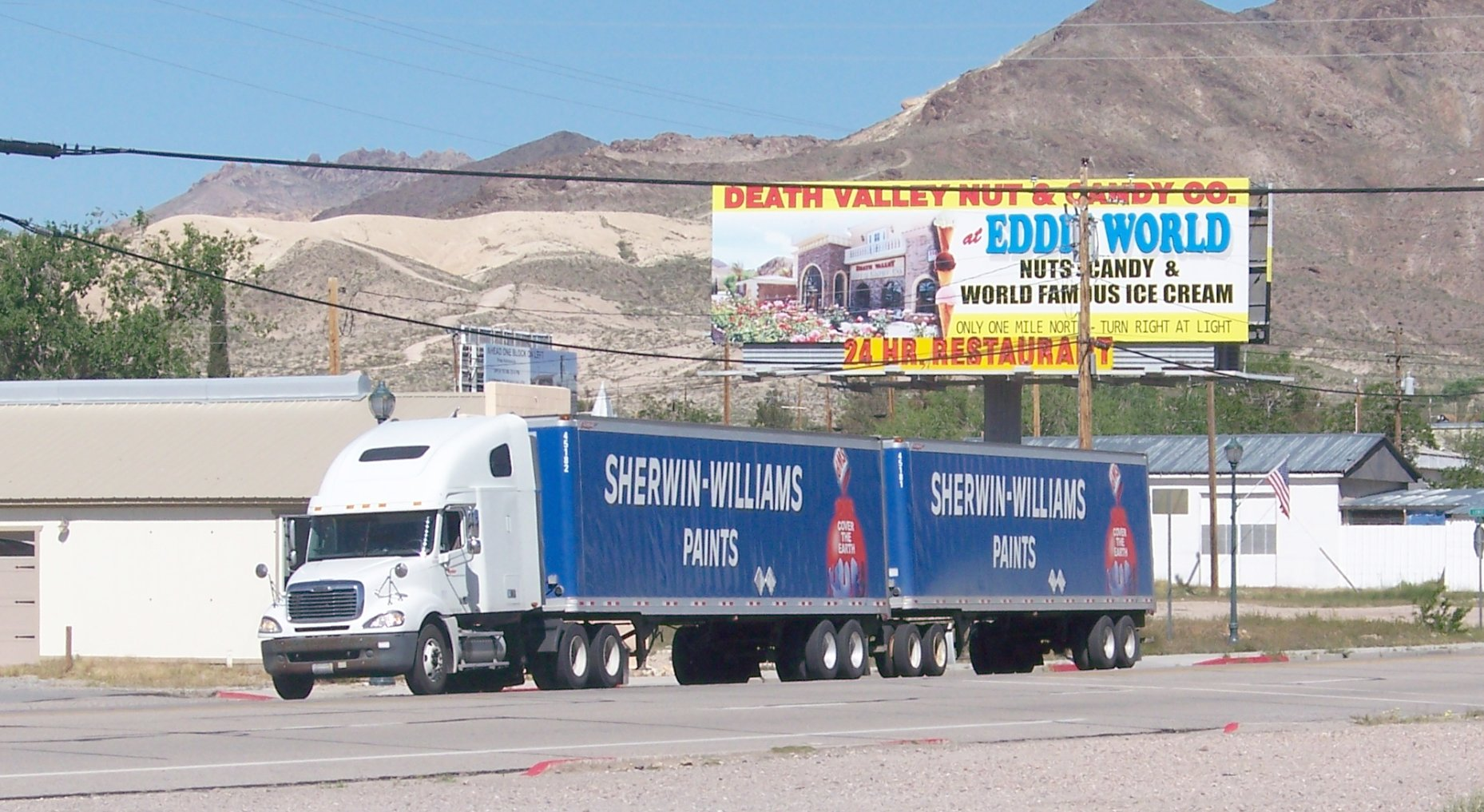
Sherwin-Williams Paints truck on US 95 Nevada

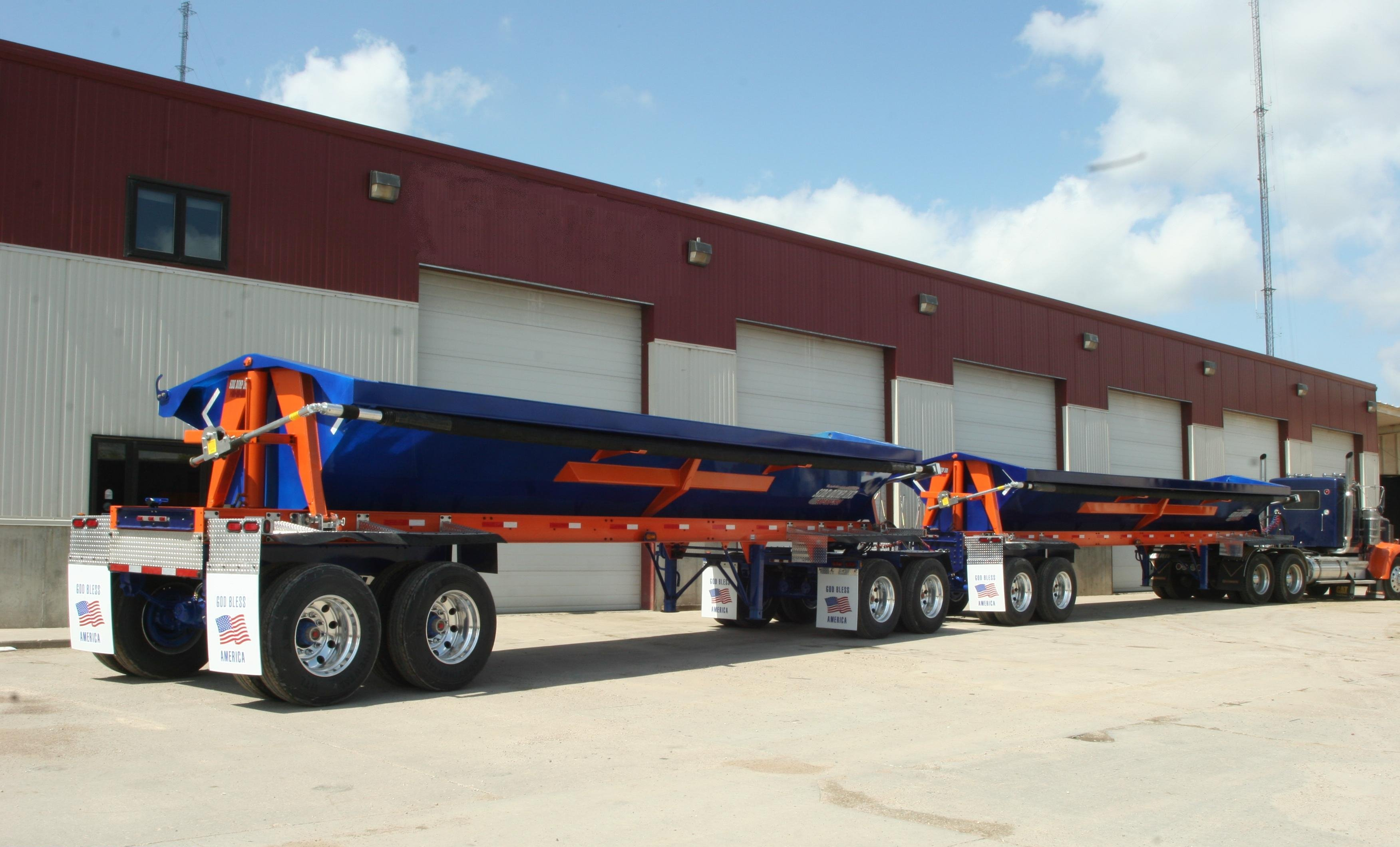
Tipper A-double in USA

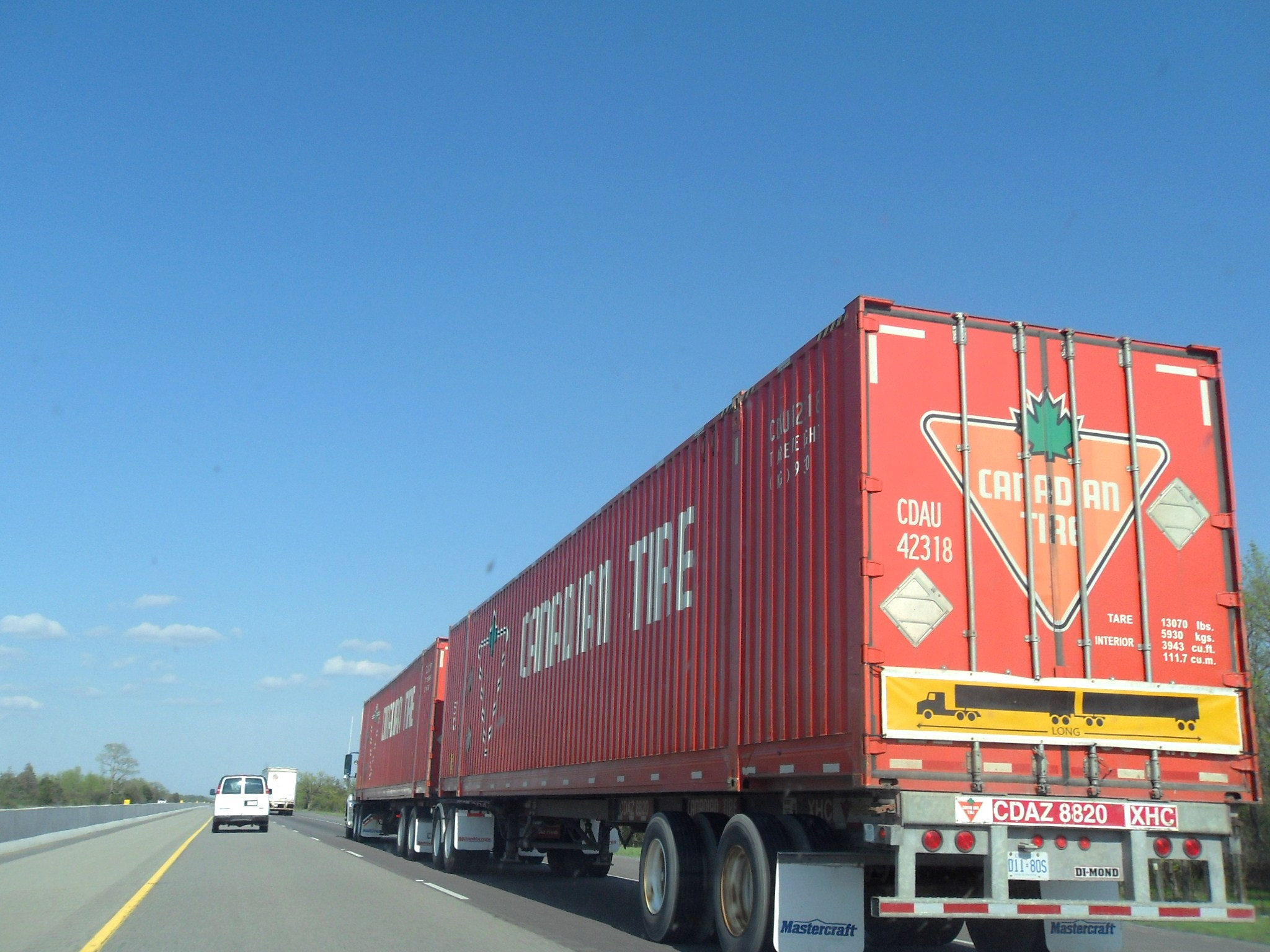
53 foot container turnpike double in Canada

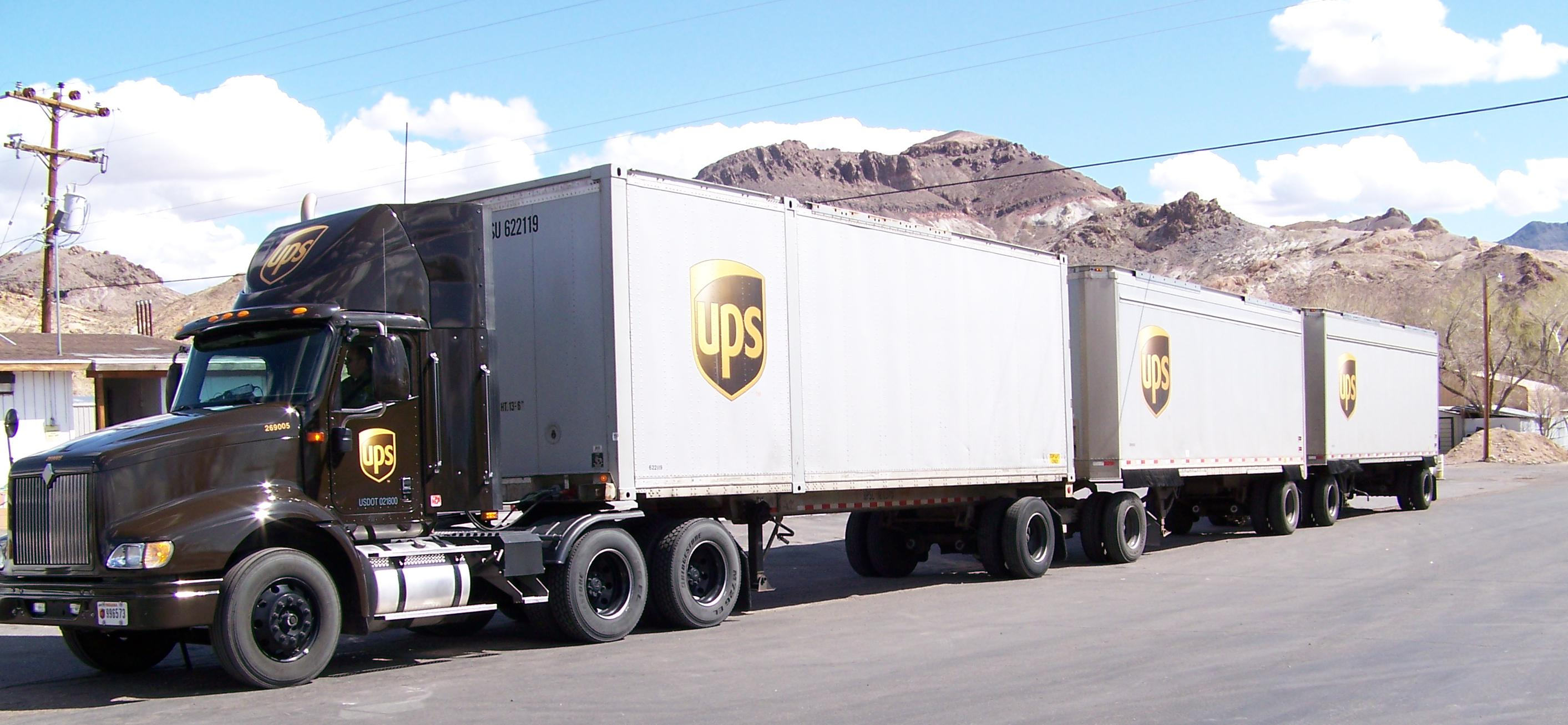
Triple trailer three 28.5-foot pups

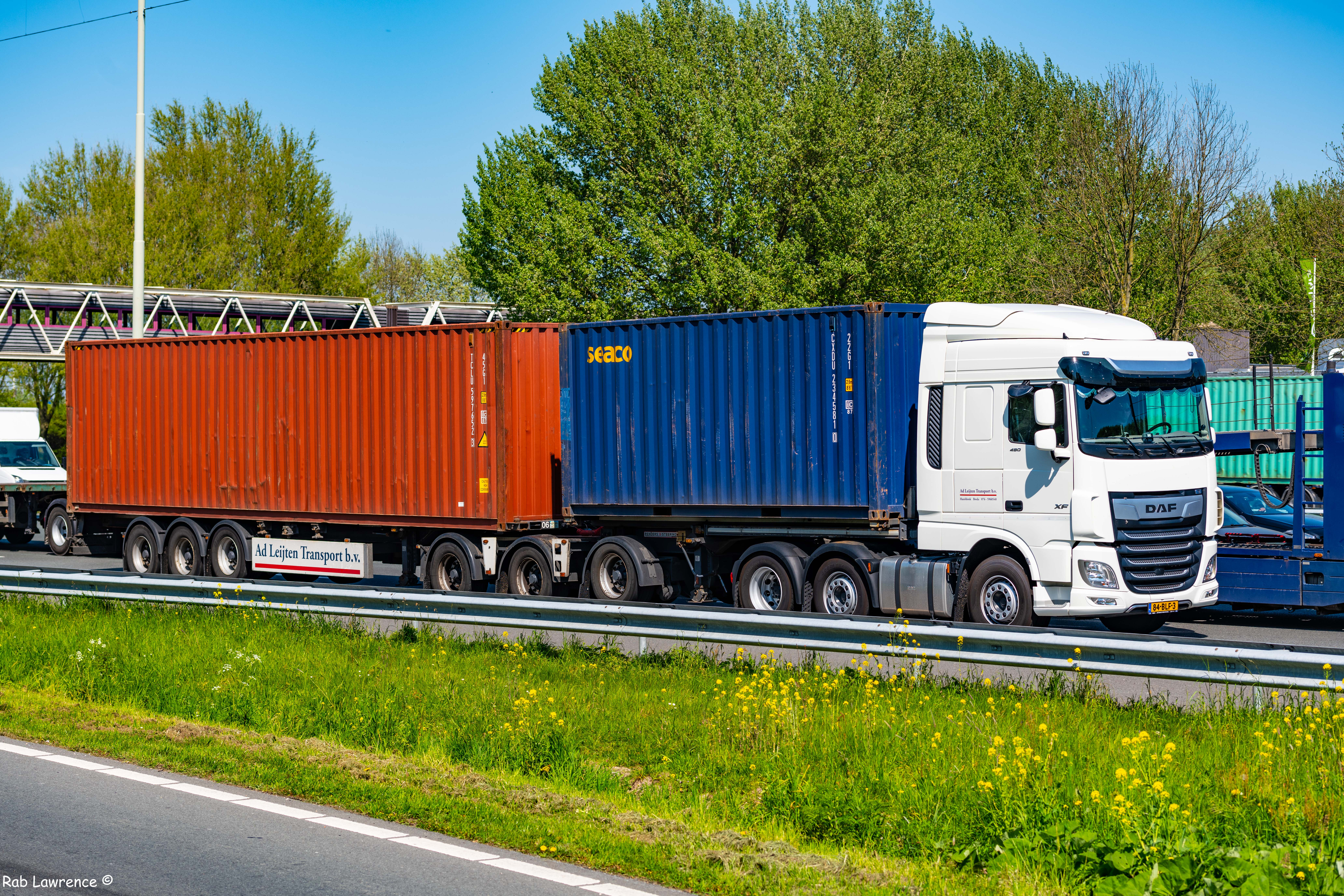
B-double with containers in the Netherlands

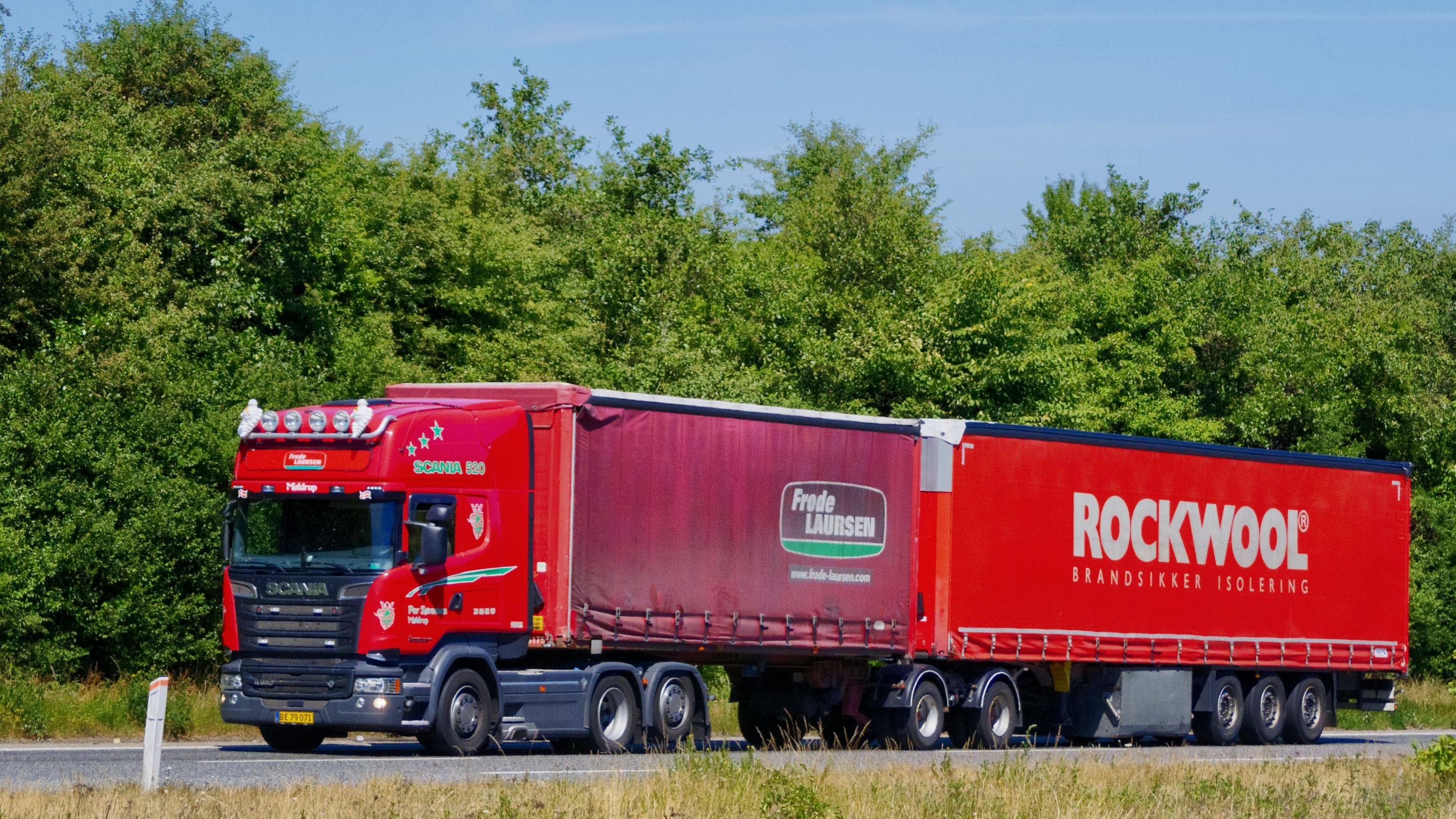
B-double in Denmark

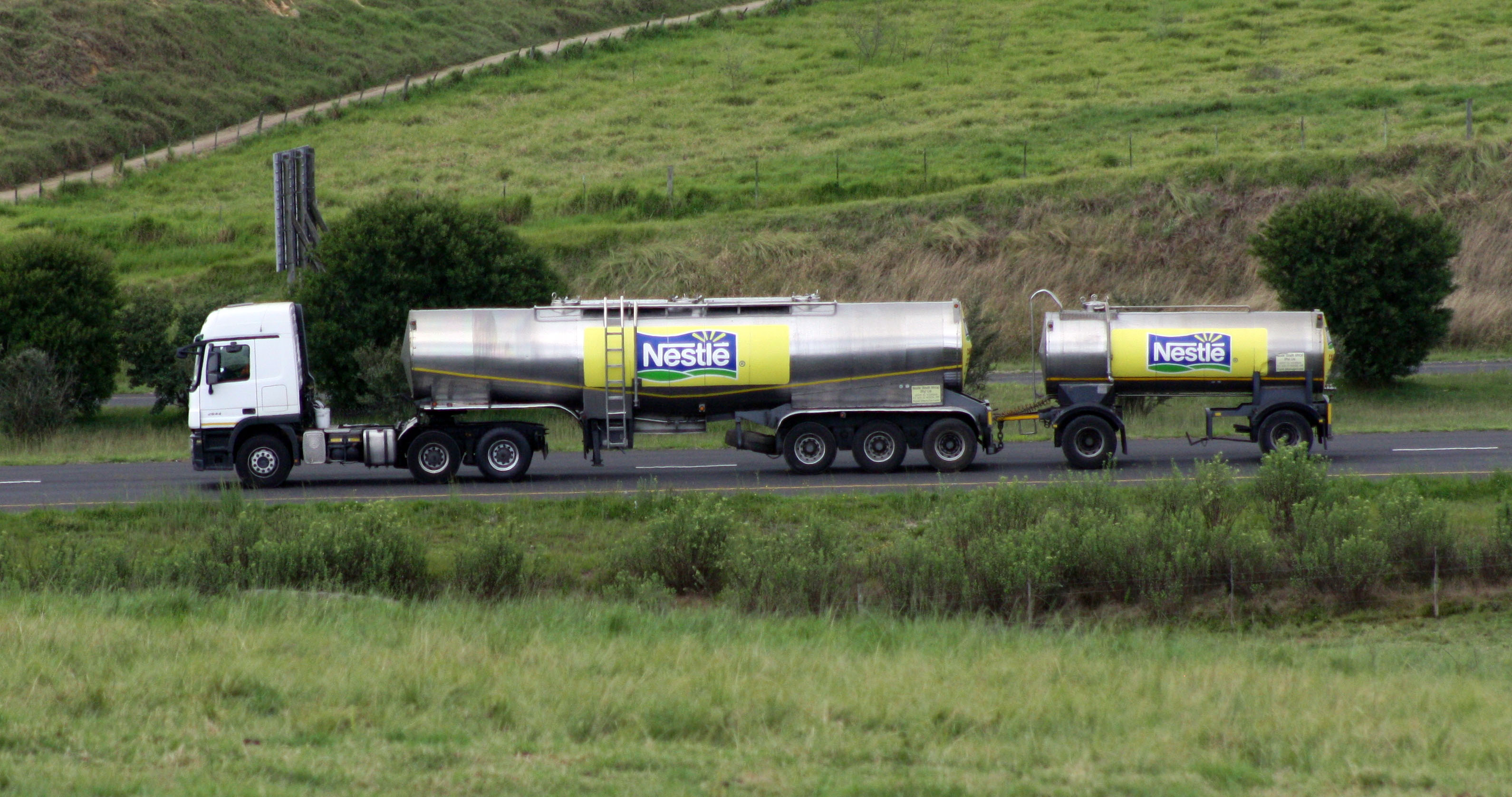
A-double in South Africa

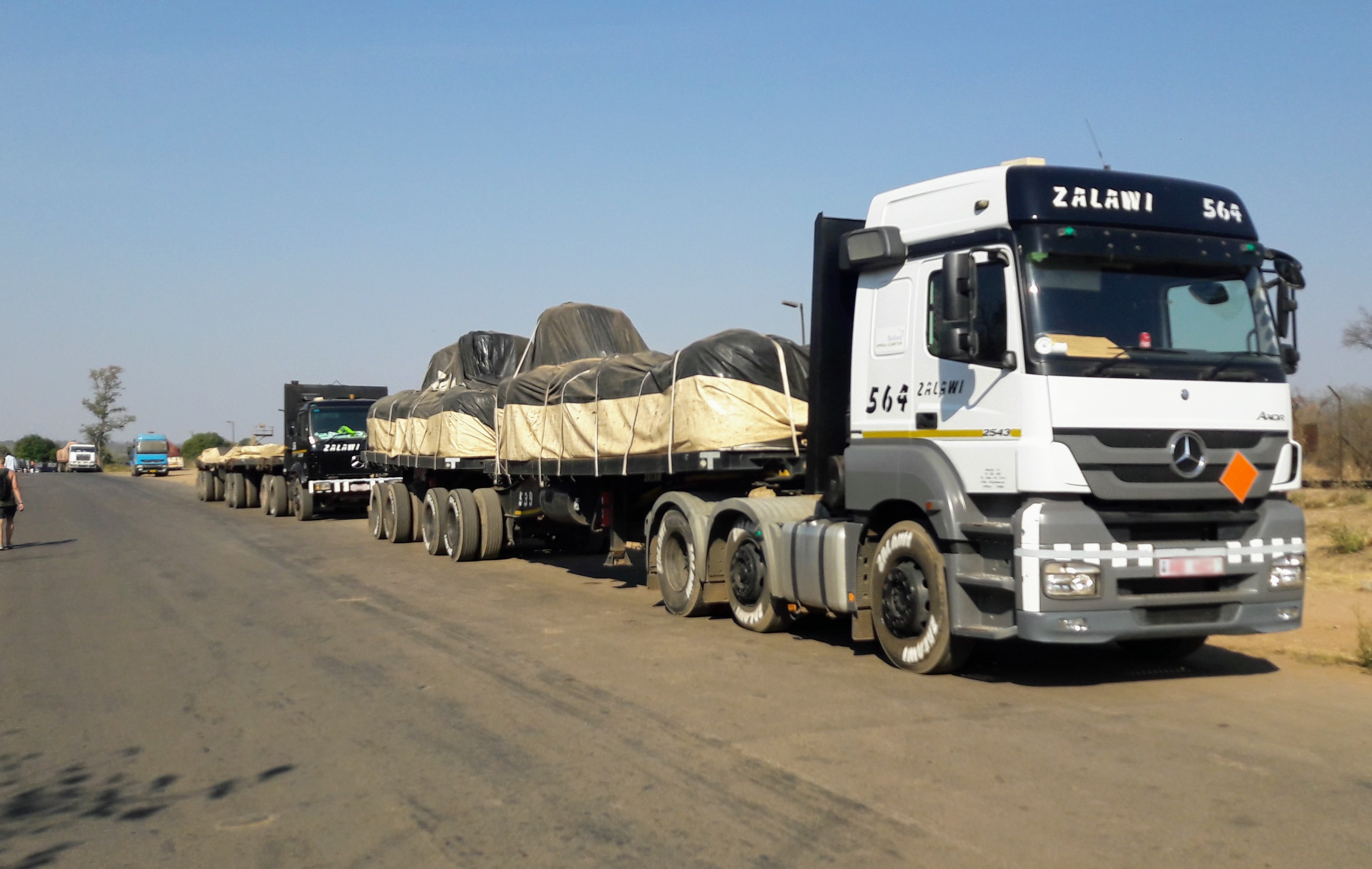
B-doubles in Zimbabwe

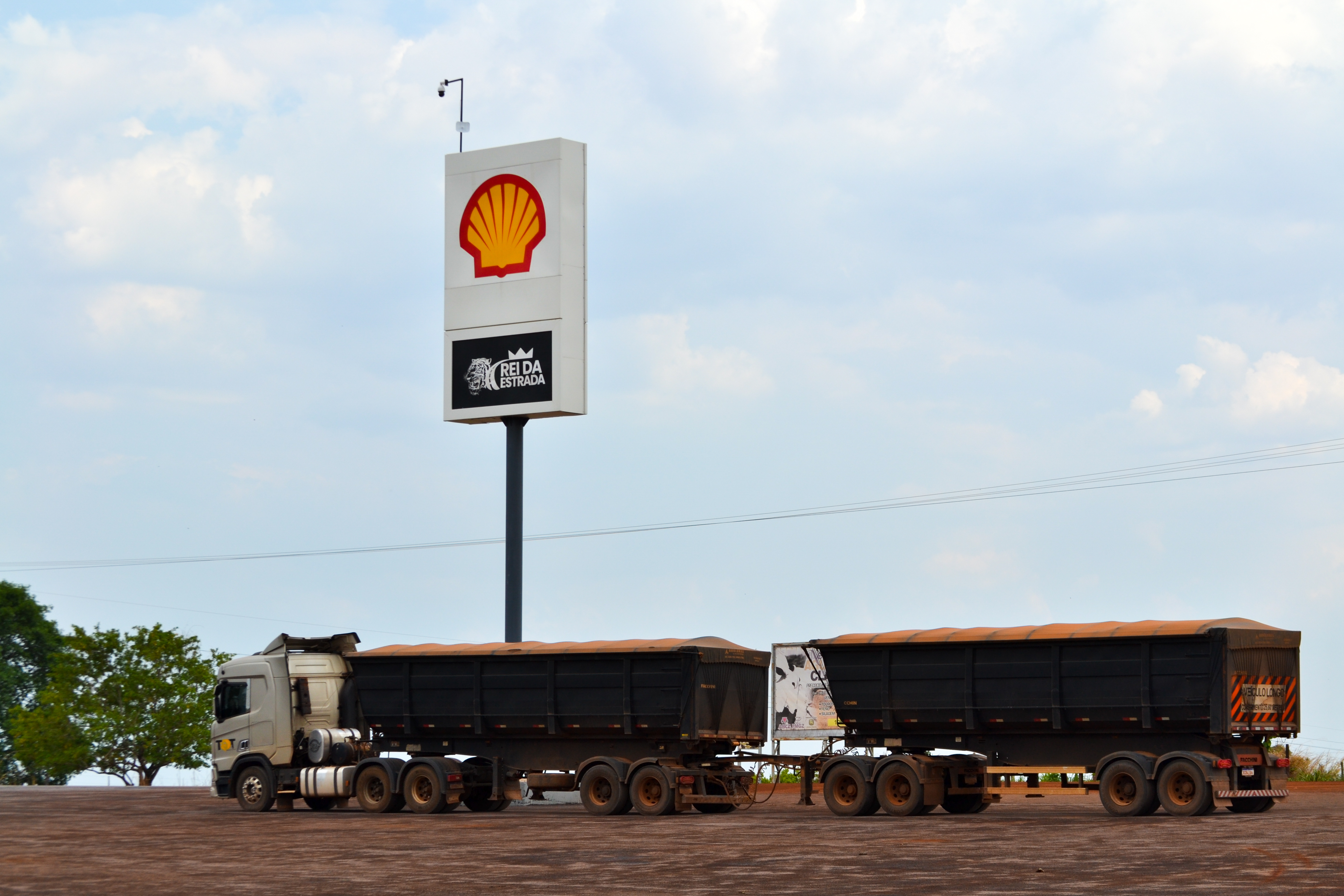
A-double in Brazil

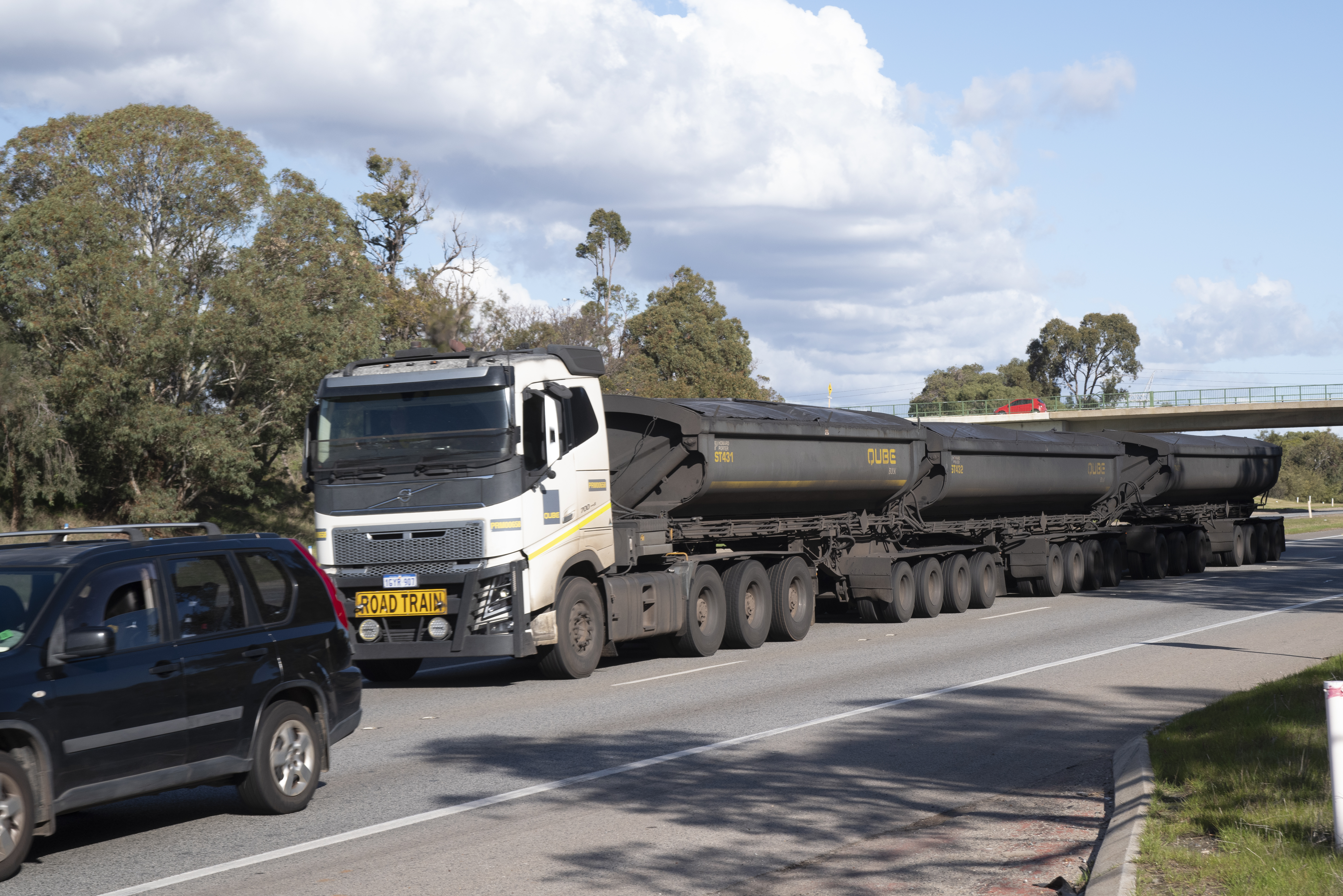
Tri-axle prime mover with quad-axle trailers and tri-axle dolly in Australia

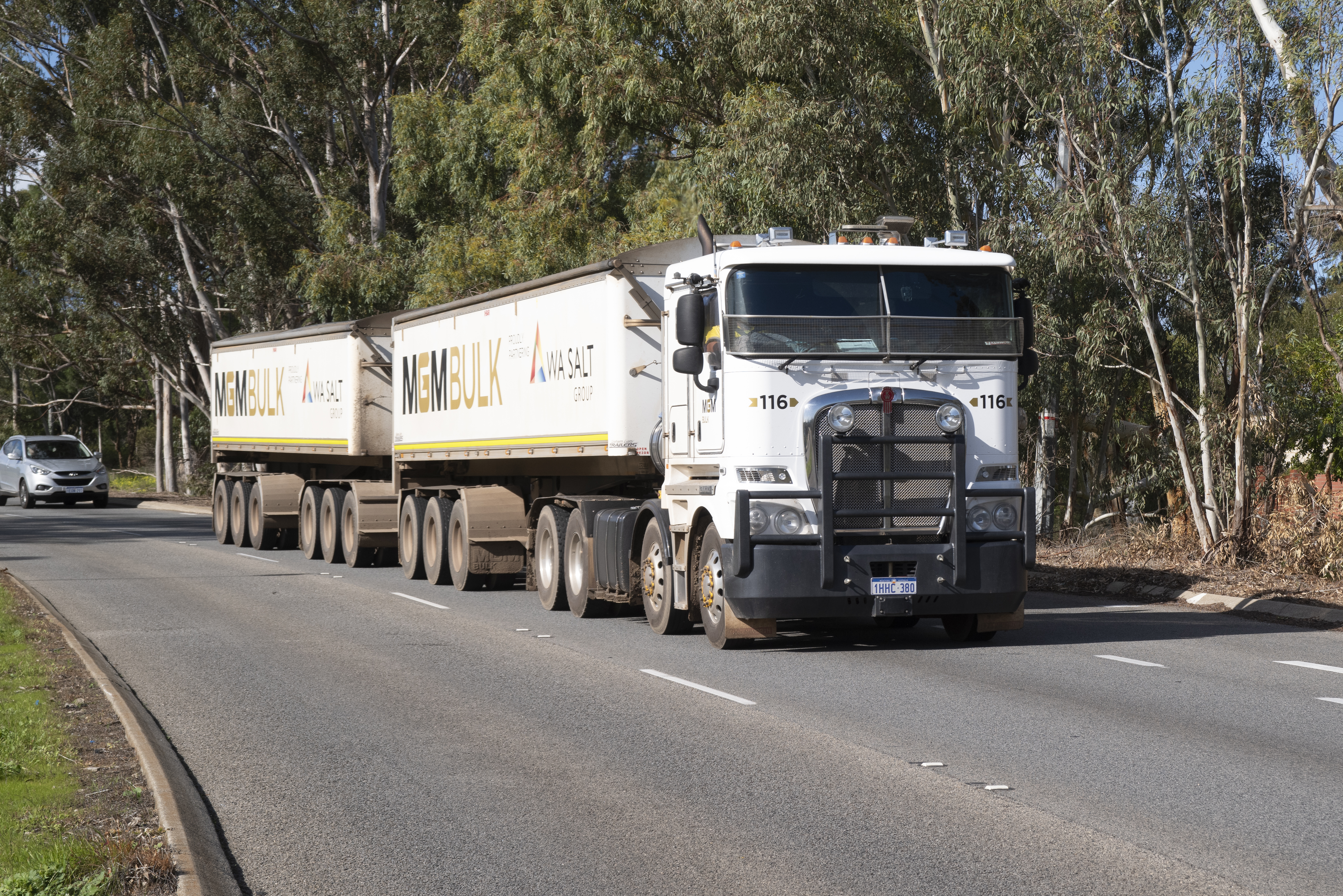
Two steer axled prime mover

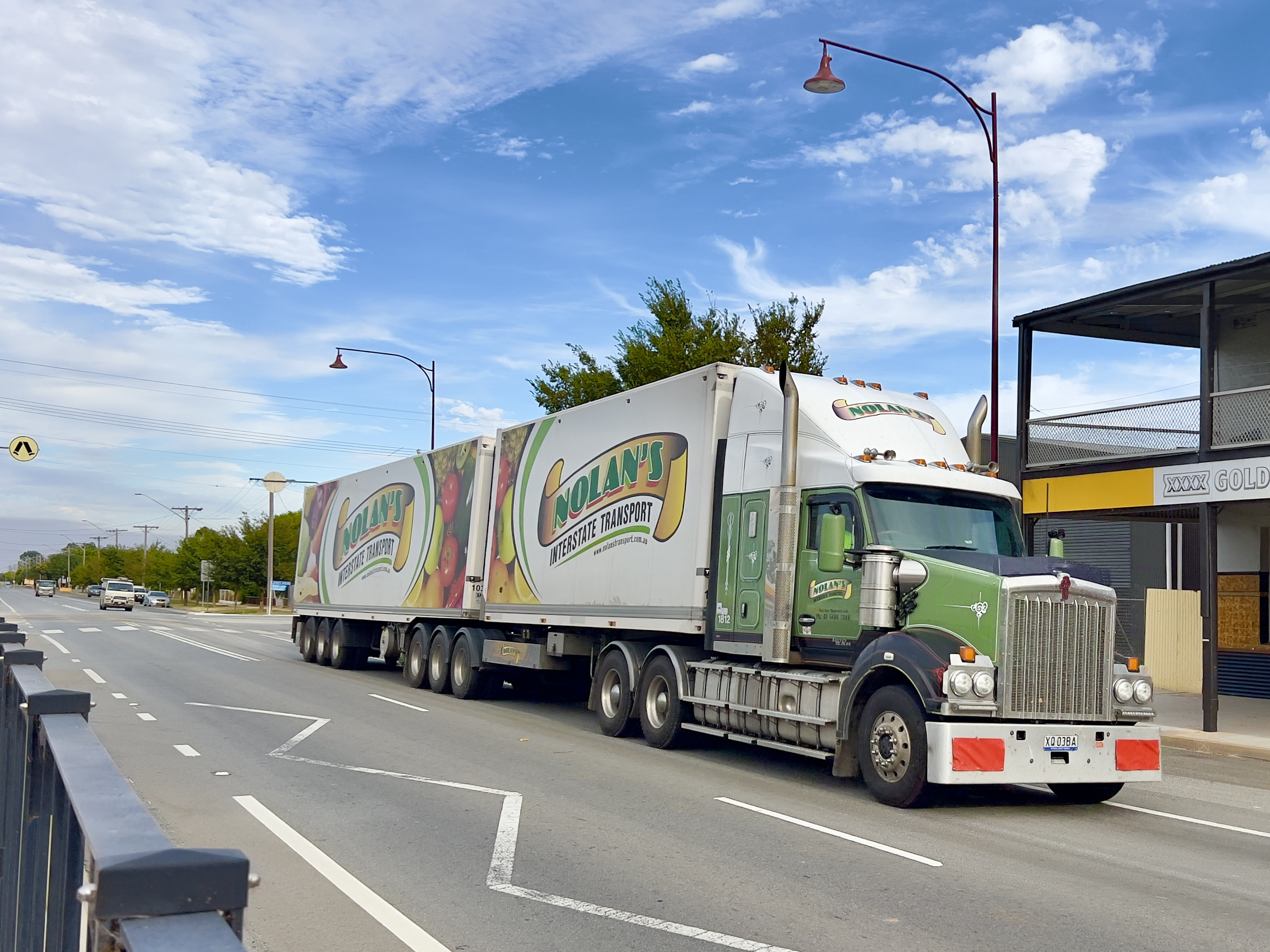
A B-double on Newell Highway

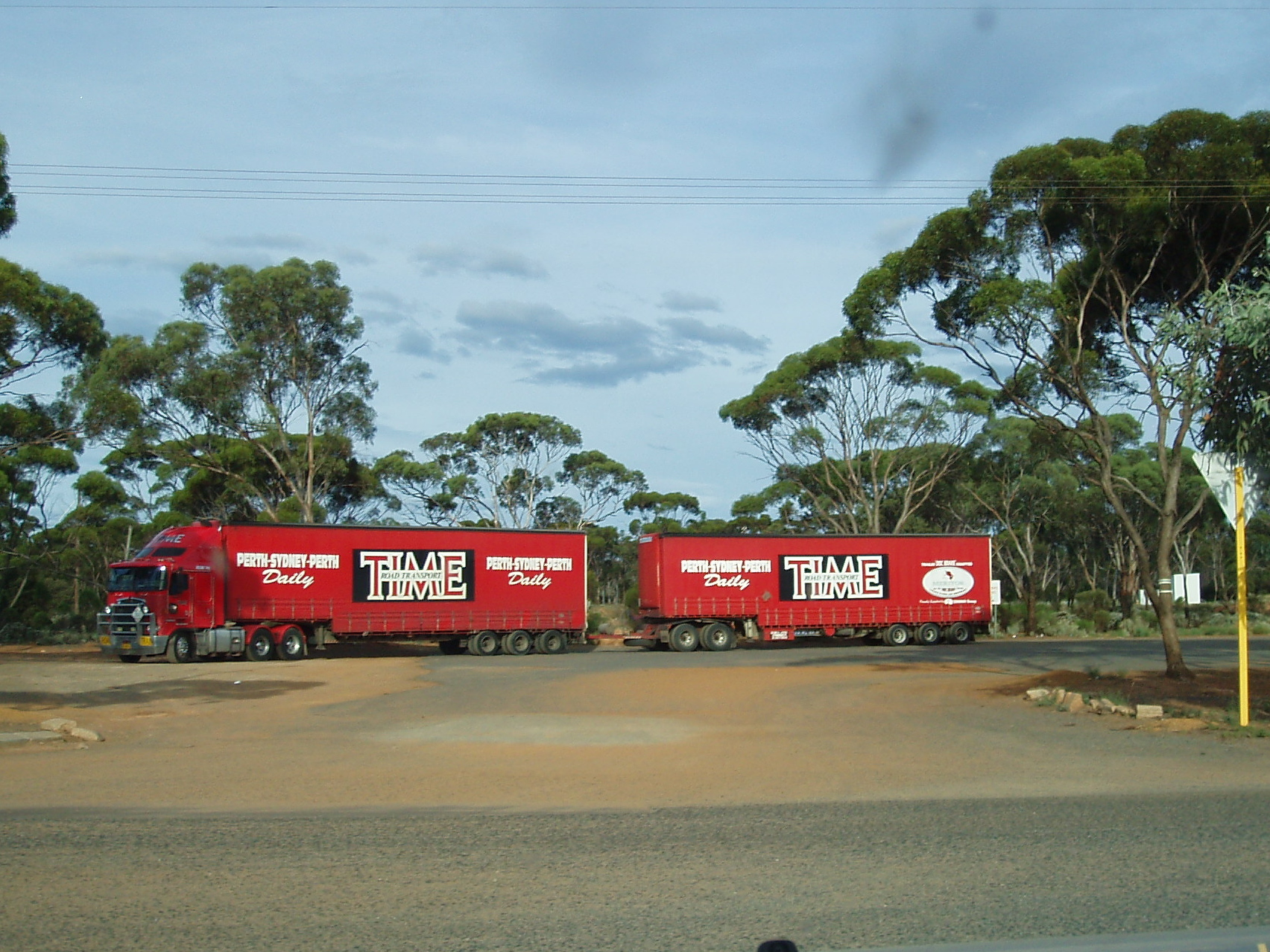
A-double

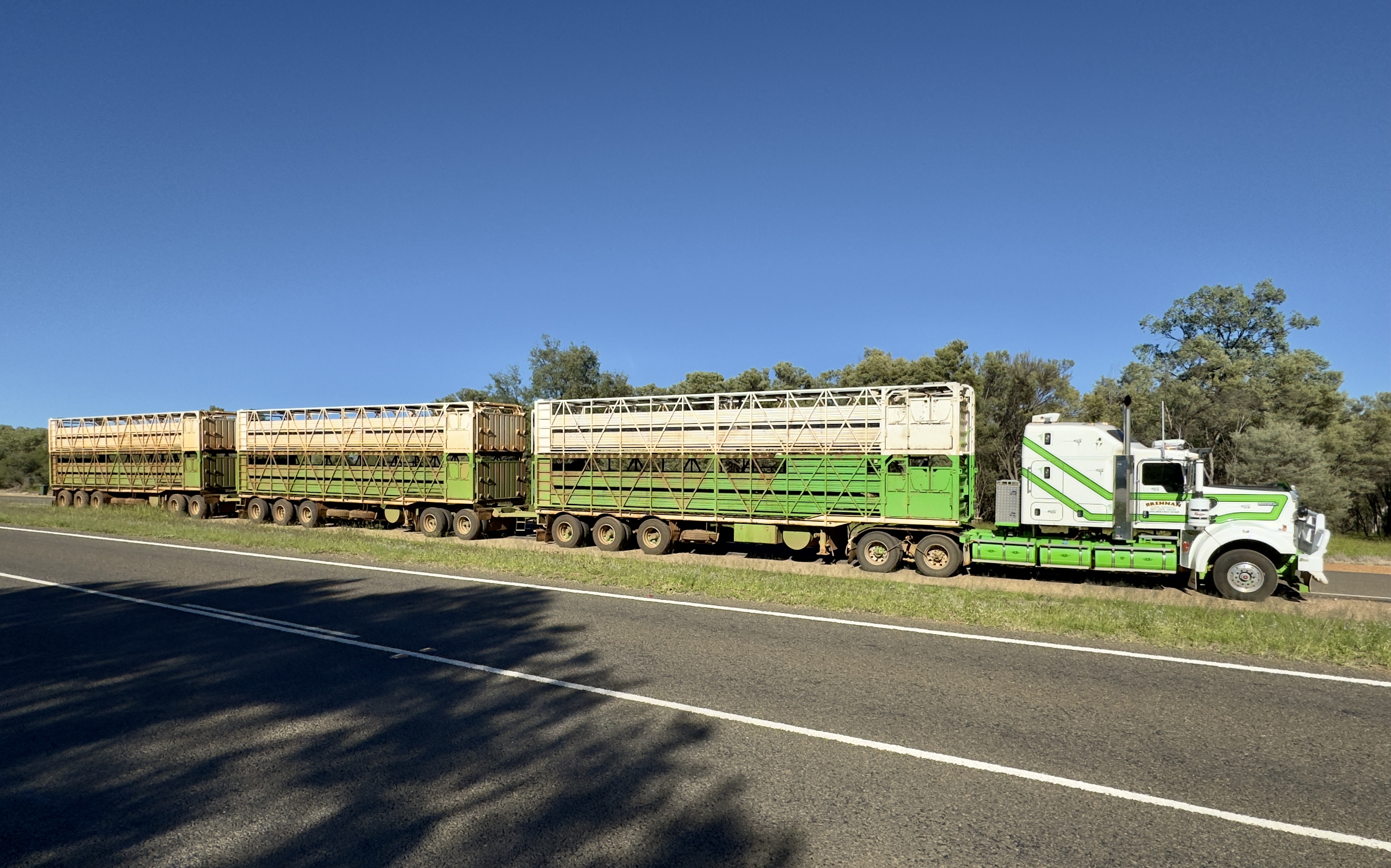
A-triple

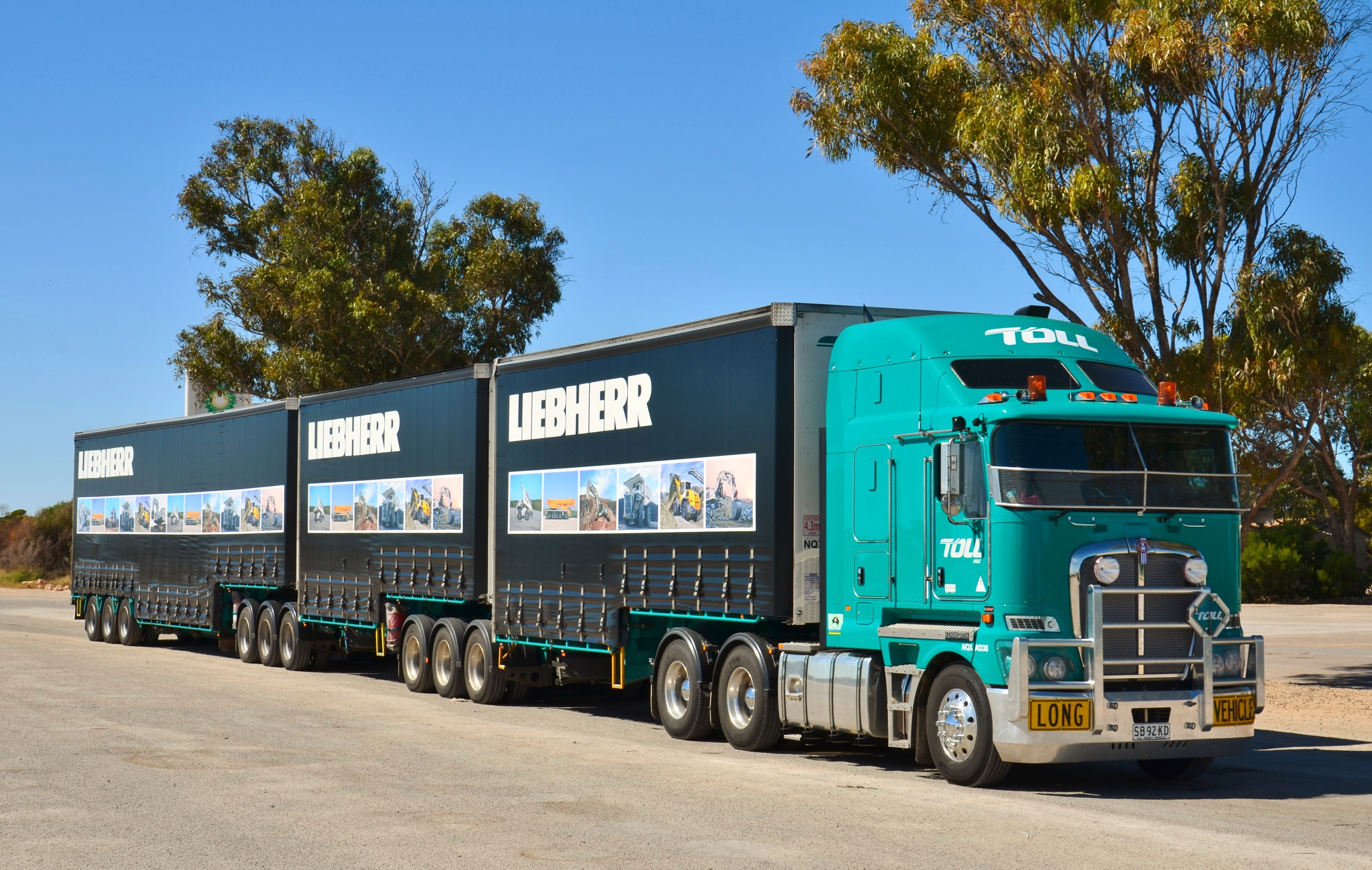
B-triple

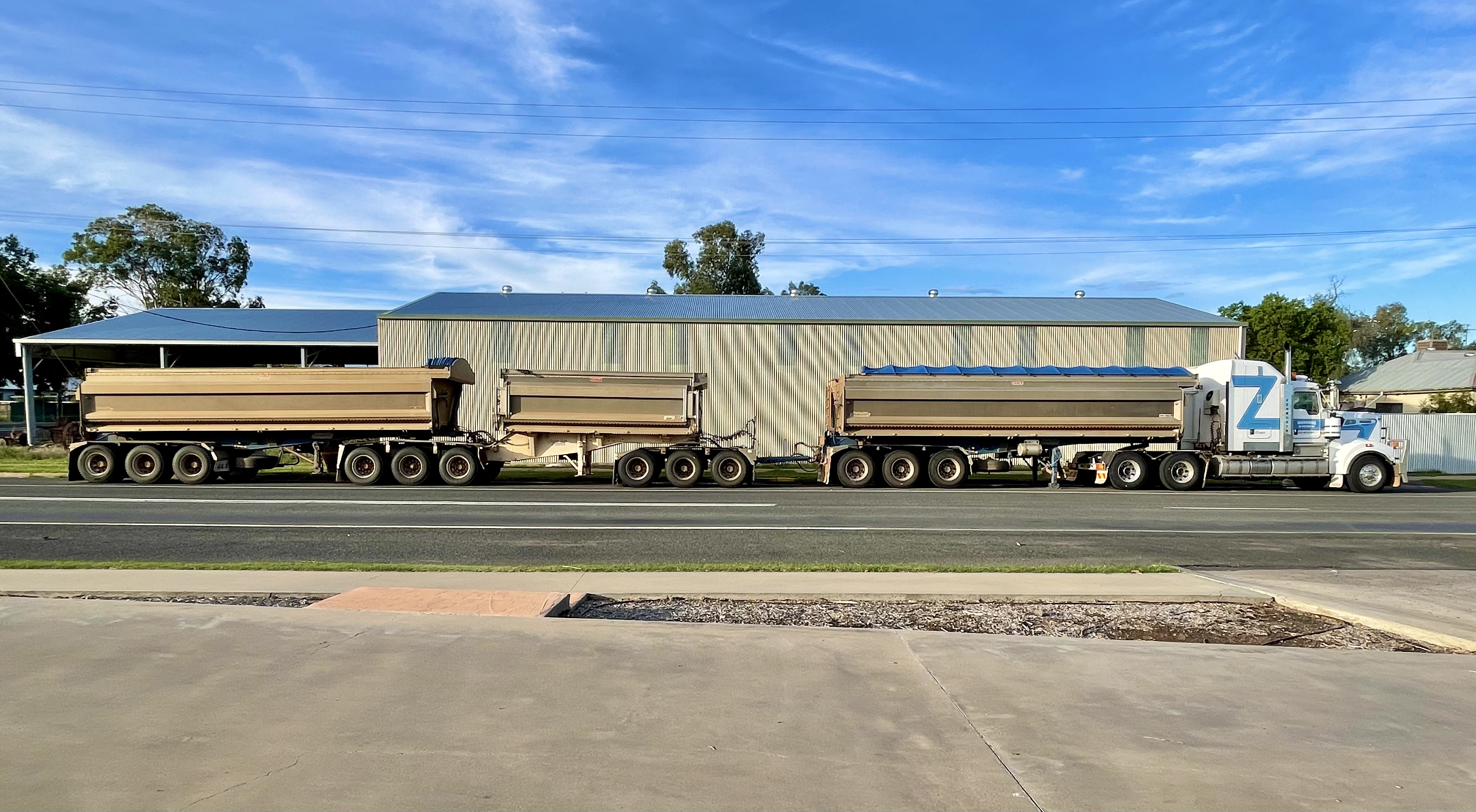
AB-triple

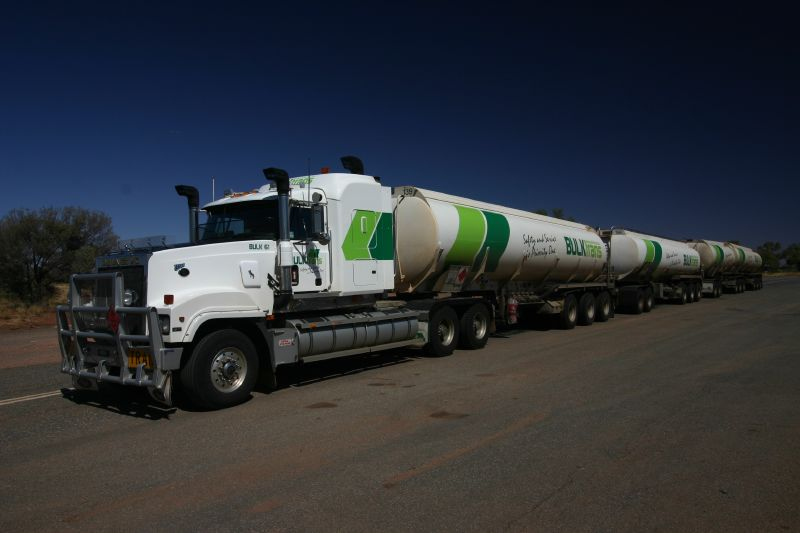
AAB quad

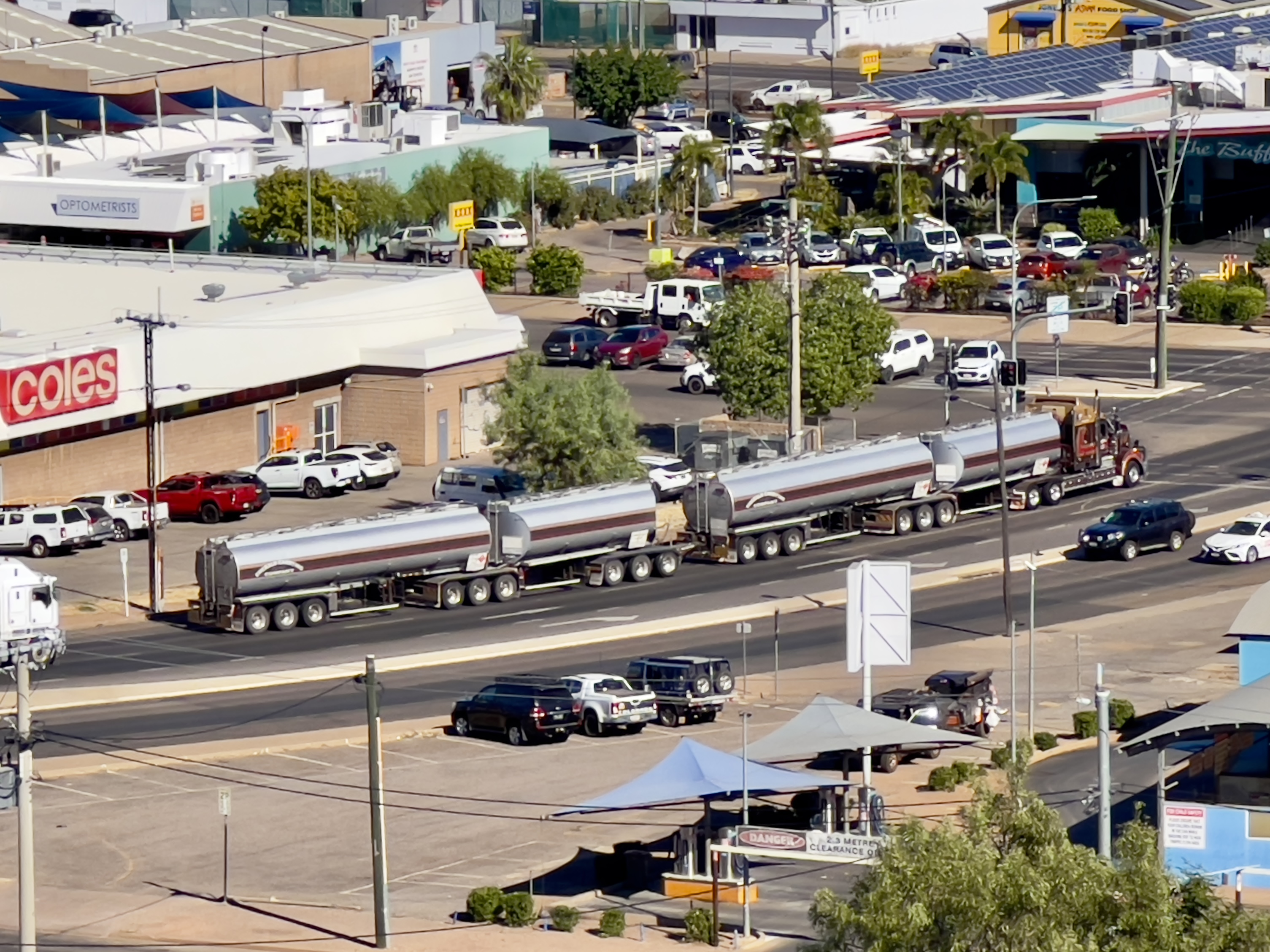
BAB quad

== See also ==
- Air brake (road vehicle)
- Articulated bus
- Brake
- Containerization
- Container on barge
- Container ship
- Dolly (trailer)
- Federal Bridge Weight Formula
- Fifth wheel coupling
- Gladhand connector
- Intermodal freight transport
- Jackknifing
- Longer Heavier Vehicle
- National Network – highway and interstate system
- Overland train
- Ringfeder coupling devices
- Road transport in Australia
- Rolling highway – freight trucks by rail
- Semi-trailer truck – large trucks such as road trains and articulated lorries
- Shipping container
- Top intermodal container companies list
- Trackless train
- Transport
