= Denby Eco-Link =

Vehicle

The Denby Eco-Link, dubbed the super lorry by the mainstream media, is a commercial vehicle designed and built by Denby Transport of the United Kingdom. The Eco-Link is a 60 tonne fully laden, 25.25 metre (82 ft 10 in) long, 8 axle B-Train (or B-Double) type of semi-trailer truck, in which a tractor unit pulls two semi-trailers, using fifth wheel couplings on both trailers. As one prototype of the UK Longer Heavier Vehicle (LHV) vehicle definition, which are longer and heavier than normal Large Goods Vehicles (LGVs, British English: lorries), it is not currently permitted to be used in the UK. As of 2009, the largest ordinary lorries in the UK have 6 axles and a maximum laden weight of 44 tonnes, and can be 16.5 metres (54 ft 2 in) long as single trailer semi-trailer trucks (British English: articulated lorries), or 18.75 metres (61 ft 6 in) as drawbar lorries.

Denby Transport, a Lincoln based haulage company owned by the Denby family, have been developing and testing the Eco-Link on private proving grounds since 2002. Denby believes that the Eco-Link offers several environmental and productivity benefits over normal lorries, without any decrease in safety, and that an active steering system used on the middle trailer gives the Eco-Link a manoeuvrability and turning circle equivalent to shorter legal LGVs. In 2004 Denby, among other UK hauliers, unsuccessfully applied for permission from the Department for Transport (DfT) to trial their LHV prototypes on the public road. In June 2008, after a two-year desk study into LHV's, the DfT ruled out approval of trials of most designs LHV considered, including the Eco-Link.

After taking legal advice, by the end of 2009 Denby Transport owner Dick Denby had concluded that, due to its manoeuvrability, and if kept to a maximum weight of 44 tonnes, the Eco-Link would be legal under a loophole in the 1986 Road Vehicles Construction and Use Regulations. Having reached an impasse with the DfT, who still regarded the EcoLink as an illegal LHV but conceded that only the courts could rule on the matter, on 1 December Mr Denby took the Eco-Link for a road test on the A46. Having already informed the police, Mr Denby was stopped outside the depot by Vehicle and Operator Services Agency (VOSA) who prohibited further tests. Prior to the test, Mr Denby stated he would fight the expected prohibition of the vehicle through the courts if necessary.

== Denby Transport ==
Denby Transport is a family owned haulage business based in Lincoln, Lincolnshire. As of 2009, 74-year-old Dick Denby was owner and chairman of the company, with his son Peter being managing director. Founded in 1926, as of 2009 it had 90 employees, operated 50 trucks, 145 trailers, and had a turnover of between 9 and 10 million pounds. Its trucks operate in a red livery, with DENBY prominently displayed on trucks and trailers in white lettering. The Eco-Link uses DENBY EXTRA lettering.

== Timeline ==
Denby began work on the Eco-Link project in around 2002. The 60-tonne Eco-Link made its debut at the British Transport Advisory Committee (BTAC) annual vehicle evaluation and fuel trials in June 2004, where it was tested for turning circles, trailer cut-in, and fuel economy.

In September 2005, Denby applied for permission from the Department of Transport to test the Eco-link on public roads. In March 2006, permission was refused by Transport minister Stephen Ladyman. The Department for Transport then initiated a desk study into various options for legalising Longer Heavier Vehicles (LHVs), encompassing options from small increases in weight and length of normal lorries, up to 11 axle 82 tonne 34 metre (111 ft 6 in) long road trains.

Political interest in the Eco-Link continued, with the Conservative opposition Transport ministers Owen Paterson from the Commons and Earl Attlee from the Lords both driving the Denby vehicle at demonstration events during 2006.

On 4 June 2008, based on the desk study's conclusions, Transport Minister Ruth Kelly postponed indefinitely the approval of trials of nearly all LHV designs, except the option of longer normal semi-trailers.

In October 2009, even though it is not approved for UK use, the Dutch trailer manufacturer Jumbo began production of the Eco-Link under license from Denby, with active steering employed on both trailers on their version, which uses 7 axles.

It was reported on 17 November 2009 that Denby intended to risk legal action by conducting a road test of the Eco-Link on the public highway using an existing legal loophole and limiting the weight to 44 tonnes, which it did so on 1 December. See #Public road test.

Following the road test, VOSA issued a prohibition order which Dick Denby disputed with VOSA on 7 December. As of 21 January 2010, Denby were awaiting clarification from VOSA as to which regulation underpinned the prohibition order.

== Eco-link ==
=== Business case ===
The name Eco-Link refers to the environmental claims made by Denby over the advantages of the vehicle over standard lorries. According to Denby Transport, the Eco-Link Trailer would "reduce road accidents and result in less road deaths", "reduce all emissions", and "needs no highway investment". Further, it asserts that two Eco-Links would replace three standard articulated lorries. In 2007 figures, the Eco-Link costs £85,000 to build. In logistics terms, unlike a drawbar lorry combination, a B-Double arrangement allows the separate delivery of either trailer by the tractor to a destination.

If limited to the current UK weight limit of 44 tonnes, it is claimed by Denby that the Eco-Link would reduce carbon emissions by 16 per cent, and could still halve the number of trips needed for the same amount of cargo carried in conventional lorries. This is based on the fact that for light but bulky goods such as toilet paper, plastic bottles, cereals and aluminium cans, conventional lorries run out of cargo space before they reach the weight limit. At 44 tonnes, the Eco-Link also exerts less weight per axle on the road compared to the standard 6 axle 44 tonne articulated combination.

=== Design ===
The Denby Eco-Link, with a Ford Mondeo positioned in front of the A-Trailer, which sits between the standard tractor unit and semi-trailer of a full size normal UK articulated lorry. The two middle axles are rigidly attached to the A-Trailer and support the fifth wheel coupling with which the rear trailer is towed. The A-Trailer wheels electronically counter steer with respect to the tractor unit.

While the Denby Eco-Link is in the catch all category of a Longer Heavier Vehicle (LHV), in particular, it achieves this using a vehicle configuration known as a "B-Train" or "B-Double". The Denby design of B-Double takes the tractor and trailer of a standard 16.5 metre (54 ft 2 in) long articulated lorry, and turns it into a B Double by adding a special trailer in the middle, which has a fifth wheel coupling mounted above the trailer bogey, extending the overall length, and hence cargo carrying volume. All in, the Denby Eco-Link has a maximum gross weight (vehicle and cargo) of 60 tonnes. It has a total vehicle length (tractor and two trailers) of 25.25 metres (82 ft 10 in), with a total of 8 axles (three on the tractor, two on the middle trailer, three on the rear trailer).

The short extra trailer in the B-Train is known as the A-Trailer. On the Denby Eco-Link, the A-Trailer contains a computer controlled active steering system linked to the main tractor, which counter-steers the wheels of this middle trailer with respect to the tractor (i.e. if the tractor turns left, the A-Trailer steers right, and vice versa), minimising the trailer cut-in at corners or roundabouts. Denby had previously been a project partner in an Engineering and Physical Sciences Research Council (EPSRC) funded research project undertaken by the University of Cambridge, which developed an active steer system for a B-double vehicle, which could overcome the problems encountered by such vehicles on UK roads. Two cameras linked to monitors in the driver's cab allow monitoring of the truck's blind-spots.

=== Performance testing ===
In the final report of the BTAC trials in November 2004, the Eco-Link was given an "excellent" rating for its performance in manoeuvrability, productivity, safety and emissions tests, superseding ordinary lorries in many respects. Private trials had also reportedly shown the Denby vehicle had a 20 per cent shorter stopping distance than conventional lorries of the same weight, due to having extra axles.

The active steer system means the Eco-Link has a turning circle of just 41 feet, the same as a conventional articulated lorry. This resolves a particular problem in the UK for LHV's, namely negotiating roundabouts. According to Roadway magazine, the Eco-Link could go anywhere a standard drawbar lorry could go, and in an RHA manoeuvrability trial it had passed turning circle tests and had negotiated a slalom course consisting of cones spaced 12 metres (40 feet) apart.

In a May 2006 test drive, opposition Transport Minister Owen Paterson said of the Eco-Link that "The steering on the back is phenomenal. The real test was going round the bus. All this fussing about what's going to happen in the villages, well that's as tight as you're going to get!"

== Public road test ==
In late 2009, having reached an impasse with the DfT and after taking legal advice, Dick Denby made it known that he was prepared to risk legal action by undertaking a public test drive of the Eco-Link without a permit, in order to clarify whether the vehicle was road legal or not, through the courts if necessary.

=== Rationale ===
Denby believed that, using a legal loophole in the existing UK law, that the Eco-Link, if kept under the current legal weight limit of 44 tonnes, and due to its ability to remain within the current limit of turning circle, would be legal to drive on the public road. Mr Denby had stated before the drive that "I am confident this vehicle is legal and safe and I’m prepared to be arrested and taken into custody if that’s what it takes to prove it"

Before attempting the test drive, Mr Denby's lawyer had said: "There appears to be a lacuna in the regulation. There is a general principle that if there is an ambiguity in the law it should be read in favour of the defendant." The DfT believed the Denby super lorry, being an LHV, was still illegal. In consultation with Denby, the DfT admitted that ultimately, only the courts could decide the legality of running LHVs, and reportedly admitted that the issue of length came under "quite a fiddly bit of legislation".

Denby Transport believed they had found a legal-loophole in the present UK law to allow the Eco-Link to be used on the public roads. The relevant legislation concerned the 1986 Road Vehicles Construction and Use Regulations. The 1986 regulations state that "certain vehicles" may be permitted to draw more than one trailer and can be up to 25.9 m (85 ft) in length. The point of law reportedly hinged on the definition of a "towing implement", with Denby prepared to argue that the second trailer on the Eco-Link was one. The DfT were of the opinion that this refers to recovering a vehicle after an accident or breakdown, but the regulation does not explicitly state this.

Both the Road Haulage Association (RHA) and the Freight Transport Association (FTA) were supportive of the Denby road test. Jack Semple of the RHA said debate on the use of LHV's "still very much alive in Europe and cannot be ignored in the UK" ...We support Denby Transport's initiative to clarify the law and "Ruth Kelly's decision was unsatisfactory and her 310-page report was not allowed to be debated". James Hookham of the FTA said "The law is currently ambiguous, which has made the legality of LHVs unclear in the UK" Opposition to the trial came from the rail freight lobby group Freight on Rail, whose Philippa Edmunds said "Denby Transport is breaking the spirit of the law, if not the law itself, and ignoring public opinion." The Campaign for Better Transport were apprehensive of the implications of a public trial of the Eco-Link.

=== Road test ===
Mr Denby had given the Police prior warning of the timing and route of the test drive, and had outlined their position in writing to the Eastern Traffic Area Office. Denby intended to take it for a half-hour test run on a seven-mile course using the A46. Mr Denby had not driven a truck for 14 years, but updated his own license in order to be able to perform the drive without exposing one of his drivers to the risk of prosecution.

On 1 December, The Eco-Link test was cut short 'barely 50 yards' from the Denby yard. The Police pulled Mr Denby over as it left the gates, in order to test it for its legality "to investigate any... offences which may be found". The Police said the vehicle was unlawful due to its length and Mr Denby was served with a notice by a Vehicle and Operator Services Agency (VOSA) inspector to remove the vehicle from the road for inspection.

Being too long to reverse into the yard, the police escorted Mr Denby in the vehicle for a mile along the A46 in order to be able to turn around at a roundabout and return to the depot. In the yard, the VOSA inspection revealed that at 7.82 metres (25 ft 8 in) long, the first trailer was too long. Mr Denby asserted that an internal bulkhead, reducing the cargo space to 7 metres (23 feet), meant the trailer was still legal under the 1986 regulations.

Having returned to the yard, Mr Denby was formally notified by Police and VOSA that the lorry could not be used, but the matter was passed to VOSA by Police, who did not arrest Mr Denby. Denby managing director Peter Denby said "The trial is now abandoned, but if the tests provide us with some clarification on the issue, this could be a step forward...This is not a challenge to the authorities, we are simply seeking clarification of the legislation" Dick Denby said "If the law decides they are illegal we'll pull it off the roads. If the law decides they are quite legal, everyone who wants one can have one"

As a result of the inspection, VOSA were thought likely to issue the lorry with a prohibition order, with the DfT being prepared to go to court if the prohibition order was challenged. Denby expressed confidence that they would not be found guilty in any prosecution arising from their decision to trail the Eco-Trailer, stating that "we could say we did all we could to negotiate this with the DfT and they have acknowledged that only the courts can decide."

=== Prohibition ===
After the road test, VOSA issued Denby Transport with a Direction Notice, prohibiting the Eco-link from the public roads. According to Dick Denby, this order was issued under Section 7 (1) of the 1986 regulations dealing with single trailers, whereas Denby were asserting that the vehicle was being run during the test under Section 7 (5), dealing with vehicles pulling two trailers, limiting them to 25.9 m (84.9 ft).

On 7 December 2009, Dick Denby queried VOSA as to which section was being applied. As of 21 January, no reply had been received. Denby said "The position is we are waiting for VOSA to confirm that as the lorry was run under Section 7 (5) the imposition of a prohibition was an error...I believe we did not break the law but I would take advice from my lawyer before running another one". A VOSA spokeswoman said it would take a "very dim view" of any further breach of the regulations.

The Denby Eco-Link is now road-legal in the Netherlands.

== See also ==
- Transport in the United Kingdom
