= Longer Heavier Vehicle =

UK vehicle class

Longer Heavier Vehicles in the UK (LHV) is a large goods vehicle category in the United Kingdom. Longer Heavier Vehicles are not currently allowed to operate on UK roads because they exceed the mandated limit of six axles and 44 tonnes (43.3 long tons; 48.5 short tons) of gross weight and length of 16.5 m (54 ft 2 in) for articulated lorries, or 18.75 m (61 ft 6 in) for drawbar lorries.

== Background ==
=== LGVs (HGVs) ===
In the UK, cargo carrying vehicles were previously defined, and are still commonly known, as HGVs (Heavy Goods Vehicles), although for harmonisation with other European Union member states, this term was officially changed to LGV (Large goods vehicle). Articulated lorries are the more common configuration of larger LGV in the UK, where a tractor unit tows a semi-trailer through a fifth wheel coupling. The drawbar configuration is a less common example of large LGV, and consists of a rigid lorry with cargo carrying capacity, which also pulls a second cargo trailer, using a drawbar link. The UK also allows the use of 18 m (59 ft 1 in) long 'bendy buses' for public transport. Buses however have their own legal classification, as PSVs (Passenger Service Vehicles).

=== Weights and dimensions ===
Since 1992, weight and axles limits for goods carrying lorries in the United Kingdom had increased in stages from 38 tonnes (37.4 long tons; 41.9 short tons) and 5 axles. As of 2009, vehicles are limited to a maximum of 6 axles, and limited to an overall maximum weight of 44 tonnes (43.3 long tons; 48.5 short tons) and 16.5 m (54 ft 2 in) in length for articulated lorries, and 44 tonnes (43.3 long tons; 48.5 short tons) and 18.75 m (61 ft 6 in) for drawbar lorries. The restriction on overall length is why the majority of UK lorries are hauled by 'cab over' tractor units, although for the minority of UK uses where the weight limit is reached before the length limit, conventional trucks are legal.

Longer, heavier vehicles (LHVs) is a classification given to any vehicle that is heavier and/or longer than these legal limits. This can involve basic extensions of the normal articulated or drawbar configuration, or can be achieved with more axles and a more complex configuration, with the largest examples being similar to so called road trains elsewhere in the world.

=== Turning circle ===
Whatever configuration of vehicle used, to be legally operated on UK roads, vehicles must adhere to the EU defined articulated vehicle turning circle regulations, which state that any vehicle must be able to navigate a turning circle around a set-point, keeping the whole of the vehicle within a corridor bounded by two circles around that point, with the inner circle having a radius of 5.3 m (17 ft 5 in), and the outer radius being 12.5 m (41 ft 0 in). Vehicle turning circles are particularly important in the UK due to the historical existence of many narrow streets, and a high number of roundabouts.

=== European Union law ===
As of 2009, some types of LHV already operate in the Netherlands, Sweden and Finland, with trials also having occurred in Germany.

As of 2009, European Union member countries only have the power to raise the existing EU weight and length limits in their own countries. As of January 2009, the European Union was considering the conclusions of a European Commission (EC) instigated report, which recommended raising limits EU wide to 60 tonnes (59.1 long tons; 66.1 short tons) and 25.25 m (82 ft 10 in), for reasons of cost-effectiveness. This would require approval of the EU Council of Ministers and the European Parliament.

== Investigations ==
=== Early applications ===
The issue of the prospect of LHVs, at the time being called "road trains" or "super lorries", being allowed on Britain's roads came to national attention through the media in September 2005, following an application by hauliers to be allowed to trial longer trucks, and a report on the issue being prepared for the Department of Transport.

UK hauliers Dick Denby of Denby Transport and Stan Robinson from Stan Robinson Group were two of the biggest supporters of an LHV trial. Both companies had been developing their own designs, and had been lobbying the government for permission to test them on UK roads. The Robinson Group were developing the Stan Robinson Road Train, an 11 or 12 axle 84-tonne (82.7-long-ton; 92.6-short-ton) combination of two 13.6 m (44 ft 7 in) semi-trailers linked by a trailer dolly. Since around 2002, Denby had been developing the Denby Eco-Link, an 8 axle, 60-tonne (59.1-long-ton; 66.1-short-ton), 25.25 m (82 ft 10 in) long vehicle with two trailers, known as a B-Double.

Supported by the Road Haulage Association, it was proposed that these LHVs would only be used on motorways to carry cargo between regional distribution centres. The application was opposed by Transport 2000 who believed it would eventually lead to the use of such vehicles in towns and villages. In March 2006, Transport minister Stephen Ladyman refused the Denby and Robinson applications, but also sought the results of further analysis. An application for a 16 m (52 ft 6 in) long trailer was also refused. The use of LHVs only on inter-modal routes was reportedly rejected due to the problems of enforcement of any such restriction.

=== DfT desk study ===
In 2006, the DfT initiated a desk based research project into the potential use of LHVs. The study was titled Longer and/or longer and heavier goods vehicles - a study of the effects if they were to be permitted in the UK, and it ran from 3 November 2006 to 3 June 2008. The compilation of the report was contracted to the Transport Research Laboratory, with Heriot-Watt University also involved.

The study looked at seven different scenarios for increased weight and/or length over the current arrangements:

- increasing the maximum articulated lorry length to 18.75 m (61 ft 6 in), to match drawbar lorries, but with no increase in the maximum vehicle weight of 44 tonnes (43.3 long tons; 48.5 short tons)
  - as above, but increasing the maximum vehicle weight to approximately 46 tonnes (45.3 long tons; 50.7 short tons) to allow for the same maximum weight of cargo to be carried
- increasing the maximum length of any combination to 25.25 m (82 ft 10 in), and increasing the allowable number of axles from 6 to 8, but with no increase in the maximum vehicle weight of 44 tonnes (43.3 long tons; 48.5 short tons)
  - as above, but increasing the maximum vehicle weight to approximately 50 tonnes (49.2 long tons; 55.1 short tons) to allow for the same maximum weight of cargo to be carried
  - as above, but increasing the maximum vehicle weight to approximately 60 tonnes (59.1 long tons; 66.1 short tons) to allow for the maximum weight of cargo to be increased
- increasing the maximum length of any combination to 34 m (111 ft 7 in), and increasing the allowable number of axles from 6 to 11, and increasing the maximum weight to 63 tonnes (62.0 long tons; 69.4 short tons)
  - as above, but with a maximum weight to 82 tonnes (80.7 long tons; 90.4 short tons)

The report had originally been due to be published in October 2007.

During 2007, the prospect of LHVs being approved sparked public debate on "road trains" for the UK, with the claimed environmental, cost and road safety benefits being contrasted with quality of life issues, and questions of perceived safety risk to pedestrians, cyclists and motorists of LHVs on British roads. An increase in the size of lorries was opposed by the rail industry, with the Freight On Rail lobby group saying in 2007 that past increases had only resulted in half empty lorries.

==== Conclusion ====
In summary, the study concluded that LHVs could not be operated in the UK without changes to infrastructure, developing dedicated routes, and changing certain speed limits. It concluded that, depending on the industry take-up, LHV usage could lead to a net increase CO_{2} emissions by effecting a modal shift from rail, although it revealed that LHVs would result in a net reduction of fatalities due to the overall reduction in vehicles on the roads, and would substantially reduce freight transport costs (although capital investment costs had not been accounted for). The report found there could be several benefits to allowing the extension of existing articulated trailer lengths, creating Longer Semi-Trailers (LSTs).

On 4 June 2008 based on the DfT report, Transport Minister Ruth Kelly declared that the use of LHVs would not be trialled in the UK, but indicated support for a study into extending the length of normal articulated semi-trailers.

Ruth Kelly's decision not to allow practical investigation of most LHVs was criticised by the Freight Transport Association (FTA), but welcomed by the UK's largest railfreight operator English Welsh & Scottish. The Chartered Institute of Logistics and Transport (CILT) believed it would have been better to allow specific trials "in order to reach an objective conclusion". The FTA had also previously wanted a number of "responsible" transport companies to be allowed to carry out monitored trials of LHVs at their own expense.

==== Longer Semi-Trailers study ====
As a result of the desk study, in June 2009 the DfT launched another study into the benefits and impact of legalising longer semi-trailers (LSTs), to investigate extending ordinary trailers by up to 2.05 m (6 ft 9 in). The LST report was not expected to be released until December 2009, and a ministerial decision on changing the regulations would take even longer. That report was being prepared by WSP, MDS Transmodal, TRL, MIRA and Cambridge University among others and would examine safety, industry benefits, CO_{2} effects and effects on the rail industry. Eddie Stobart was also trialling a 950 mm (37.4 in) longer than standard trailer in 2009.

==== Denby 44 tonne legal challenge ====
In late 2009, Lincoln based haulage company Denby Transport announced their intention to challenge the prohibition of LHVs, through the law courts if necessary. On legal advice, Denby had taken the view that, due to its manoeuvrability, and if kept to the present legal maximum weight of 44 tonnes, their Denby Eco-Link LHV would be legal to use under a loophole in the present UK laws, namely the 1986 Road Vehicles Construction and Use Regulations. The DfT, maintaining that it was an illegal LHV, conceded that only the courts could definitively rule on the issue. Feeling he had reached an impasse with the DfT, on 1 December the company owner Dick Denby took the Eco-Link for a test drive on the A46, intending to fight any resulting prohibition order through the courts. Having been notified by Mr Denby beforehand, police stopped the vehicle just outside the gates of Denby's depot, and Mr Denby was ordered to return the vehicle to the depot pending an inspection by the Vehicle and Operator Services Agency (VOSA), who were expected to prohibit the vehicle from being used.

=== DfT GB Longer Semi-Trailer Trial ===
Following the desktop studies, DfT indicated that while they did not believe a further increase in the maximum weight of HGVs should be considered, they were open to the idea of trialling an increase in length, within the current maximum vehicle dimensions already in use (18.75m Rigid+Drawbar Combinations).

In 2011/12 DfT launched a 10-year trial of high-volume, longer semi-trailers (LSTs) in the UK. The trial was designed to demonstrate whether anticipated (from desktop studies) gains in terms of carbon reduction and safety improvement (arising from reduced numbers of journeys) would be delivered in real world operations as part of existing fleets. The trailers were required to meet a range of other technical specifications, in particular, that each new chassis design be tested to show it could meet the standard GB turning circle requirements.

The trial initially allocated spaces for up to 1800 trailers with a trailer length up to 15.65m (which with the tractor unit added, fits inside the 18.75m noted above). The number of spaces on the trial was expanded in 2018 and at the time of the last annual report, there were 2,565 trailer licences (Vehicle Special Orders) issued to 228 haulage operators. The trial was open to operators of all sizes, as long as they could meet the data submission requirements, and the participants on the trial included companies across diverse parts of the freight industry and varied in size from the largest national operators, to single vehicle owner operators.

An independent evaluation consultant (Risk Solutions) was appointed and has been in place for the whole duration of the trial to date (2021), with all haulier data being held by the evaluators, rather than by the DfT. The consultants present an annual report on the trial and these, along with many intermediate special analysis documents arising from the trial, have been published on the DfT website, presenting results including an average saving on journeys of 8% (to December 2019) giving a saving of 48,000 tonnes of CO2e and 241 tonnes of NOx. The reduction in journeys also contributes to a reduction in incidents.

At the same time, analysis of the rate of safety and damage incidents on a per km basis, the trial has demonstrated that it is possible to operate LSTs as safely, or indeed more safely, than the averages for GB articulated HGVs. Qualitative analysis involving operators on the trial attributes this to good practices in not only the training of drivers before they operate LSTs, but a whole range of operational measures including route risk assessment and compliance management. Insights into the many practices adopted by hauliers in integrating LSTs safely and efficiently to their operations were published alongside the analytical results in November 2020.

==== Longer Semi-Trailers - GB Consultation ====
The trial was initially intended to run to 2022, and was then extended (when the number of allocations was increased to 2,800) to run until 2027.

In November 2020, DfT published a consultation into ending the LST Trial and options for proceeding to wider use of the trailers under one of several possible regulatory options. DfT stated that "we believe the trial has reached a point where continuing is unlikely to provide useful results and that remaining issues, relating to the safety, can only be answered outside of trial settings". The consultation closed on 1 February 2021 and DfT's conclusions on next steps are pending.

==== Longer semi-trailers permitted on UK roads (2023) ====
Following the conclusion of the consultation, the Department for Transport decided to end the trial and permit longer semi-trailers (LSTs) for general use rather than under individual Vehicle Special Orders. On 10 May 2023 the government laid legislation before Parliament, and from 31 May 2023 semi-trailers up to 15.65 m in length (around 2.05 m longer than the previous standard 13.6 m trailer) became permitted on Great Britain's roads, ending the 11-year trial. The maximum permitted gross weight for heavy goods vehicles was not changed, remaining at 44 tonnes (43.3 long tons; 48.5 short tons). The change was enacted through The Road Vehicles (Authorisation of Special Types) (General) (Amendment) Order 2023. The DfT published guidance for operators on the safe use and implementation of LSTs, including driver training, route risk assessment and operational management requirements.

== See also ==
- Transport in the United Kingdom
- Road train
