= Alfa Romeo 150A =

Overview
- Production: 1957 - 1958

Body and chassis
- Related: Alfa Romeo 140A

Alfa Romeo 150A is an Italian bus produced by Alfa Romeo in 1958. It was improved version of 140A, with same body. It was made as 12m version for cities and 22 m version for longer distances. The short version had 3 axels, where as 22m version had 5 axles. It was used till 1975. Before being dismantled, some specimens of the 140A version lorry, were sent in Friuli after the earthquake of 1976 to be used as emergency shelters.

== Technical characteristics ==
The bus shared its chassis and other characteristics with Alfa Romeo 140A. Construction was by Macchi. The bus used the Alfa Romeo 1610 diesel engine, it was placed in the front cabin and had a six -cylinder, bore and stroke were, respectively, 125 mm and 150 mm, which brought the total capacity to 11,050 cc. The power output was 163 hp at 2,000 rpm. It had manual gearbox, and the steering wheel was positioned on the right.

== Production ==
Twenty-two copies were produced.

== Transport ==
The bus was used by ATM in Milan, Italy.

== See also ==
- List of buses
