= Ringfeder =

German manufacturing company

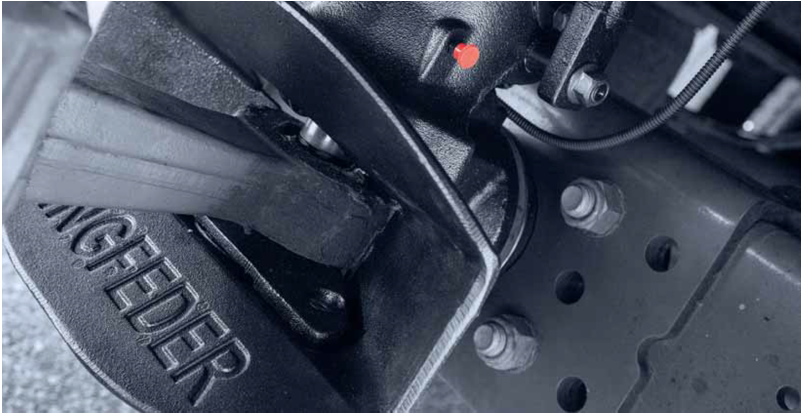
- Ringfeder trailer coupling
- Industry: Truck & Trailer Equipment
- Founded: 1922
- Area served: Worldwide
- Parent: VBG Group
- Website: https://www.ringfeder-rf.com/

Ringfeder name (pronounced in English /ˈrɪŋfiːdər/ RING-fee-dər) is a German brand based in Krefeld founded in 1922. The brand manufactures bolt couplings, hook couplings, drawbar eyes, underrun protections and accessories. Ringfeder is part of VBG Truck Equipment, one of the divisions in the VBG Group, a large international industrial group.

== Description ==
A bolt coupling device comprises a drawbar, a swivelable cast "bell" with a horizontal opening in the middle, a machined pin or "bolt", an automatic pin release mechanism, a safety locking device with actuating handle and a cushioned mounting plate. The design of the pin allows articulation of up to 70 degrees around the drawbar eye in the pitch and yaw directions. The coupling can also rotate through 360 degrees in roll.

== Mechanism ==
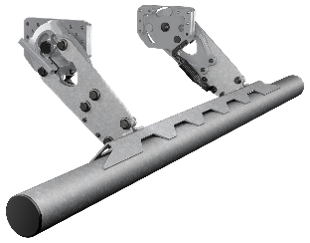
A Ringfeder underrun protection with round beam

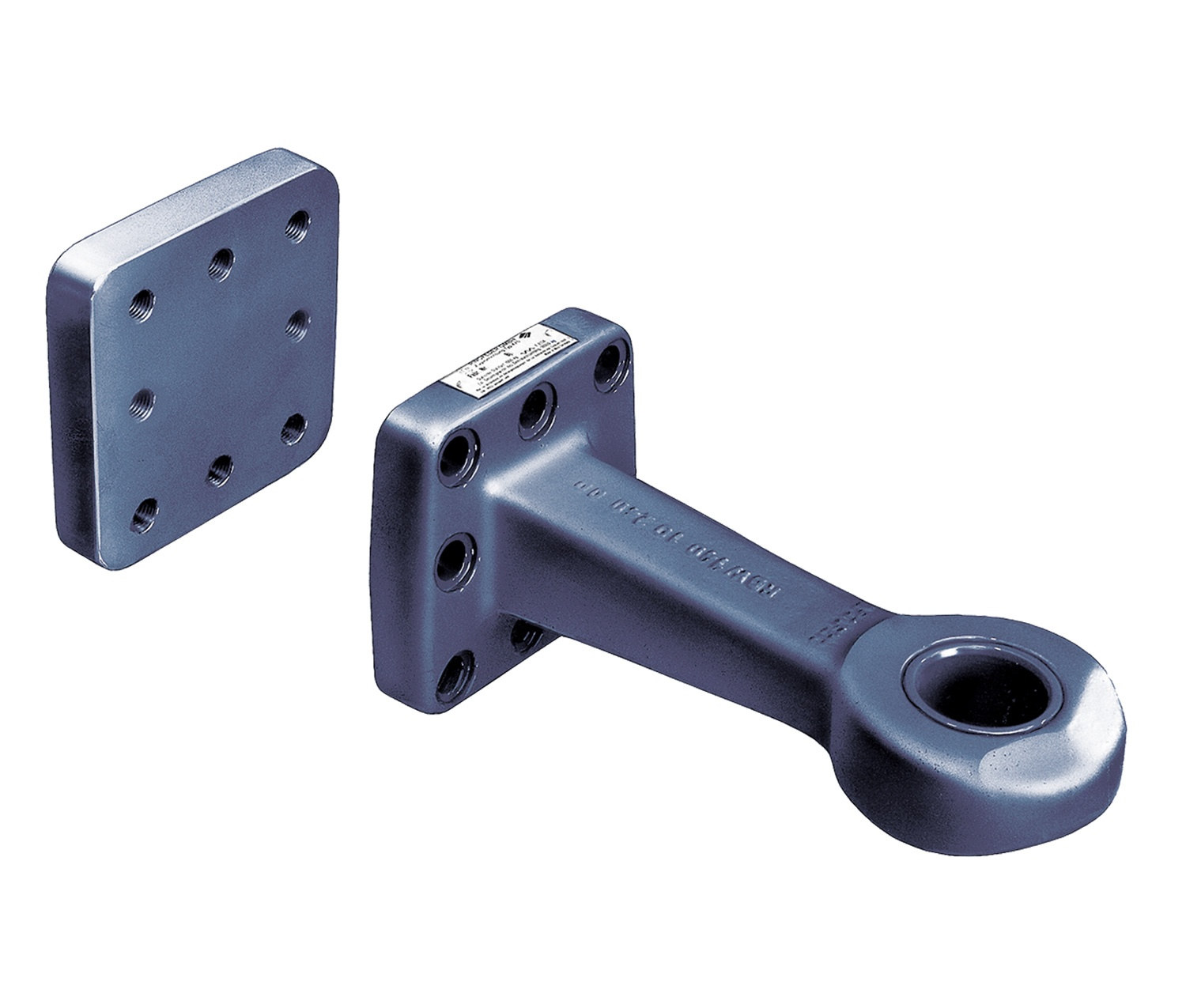
This is the drawbar eye, the part of the drawbar that goes inside the Ringfeder coupling and the locking pin drops into the loop.

A Ringfeder is typically mounted to a specially designed and built crossmember on the rear of the vehicle. This could be on the rear of a ballast tractor, rigid truck, prime mover or trailer. This mount also includes air, electrical and, if necessary, hydraulic fittings.

Firstly, the vehicle is reversed up to the drawbar of the trailer/dolly, stopping short of hitting. The height of the drawbar is checked, and adjusted accordingly. The safety catch handle on the upper left of the Ringfeder is pulled out and turned 90 degrees, and then allowed to return into the upper detent on the shaft collar. This then allows the actuator handle on the right of the body to be lifted to the stop. This pulls the bolt upwards, and sets the automatic tripping function. The Ringfeder is now ready to be coupled.

The vehicle is reversed slowly until the drawbar eye enters the bell, tripping the bolt and closing the coupling. A check is made of the coupling to ensure full engagement, air lines and electrics hooked up and drawbar leg stowed.

== Uses ==
Ringfeders are used in nearly all aspects of world transport, the most common being large goods vehicles throughout Europe, and road trains in Australia. In the Americas a similar product is used, known as a "pintle hook" (a type of tow hitch). It is a must for a ballast tractor due to lack of a fifth wheel, making drawbar coupling the only option to connect hydraulic modular trailers (HMTs).

== Products ==
- Coupling
- Underrun protection
- System Solution
- Drawbar
- Drawbar eyes
- Spare parts

== See also ==
- Drawbar
- Dolly
- Ballast tractor
- Drawbar eyes
- Hydraulic modular trailer
