= Alfa Romeo 140A =

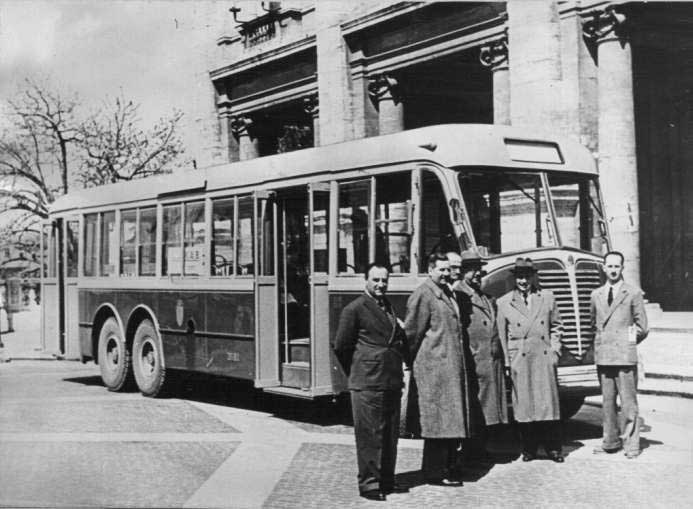

Overview
- Production: 1950-1958

Powertrain
- Engine: 12,517 cc

Alfa Romeo 140A is an Italian bus model produced by Alfa Romeo from 1950 to 1958. The bus was produced for Azienda Trasporti Milanesi (ATM) in Milan, Italy.

== Bodies ==
The bus used bodies from SIAI-Marchetti from 1950 to 1951 (19 units), Macchi-Baratelli from 1952 to 1953 (30 units) and Macchi and Caproni from 1952 to 1958 (78 units).

== Technical characteristics ==
The bus was made in two sizes, 12 or 22 meters long and had 3 or 5 axles. The gas engine is 12,517 cc (12.517 L) with 140 hp at 1700 rpm or 163 hp at 2000 rpm.

Seating capacity varied between 32 or 46 seats (articulated version), while the largest 5 axle configuration carried 150 people.

== Transport ==
- Azienda Tranvie ed Autobus del Comune di Roma (ATAC), Rome
- ATM, Milan

== See also ==
- List of buses
