= Articulated vehicle =

Vehicle containing a pivotal joint

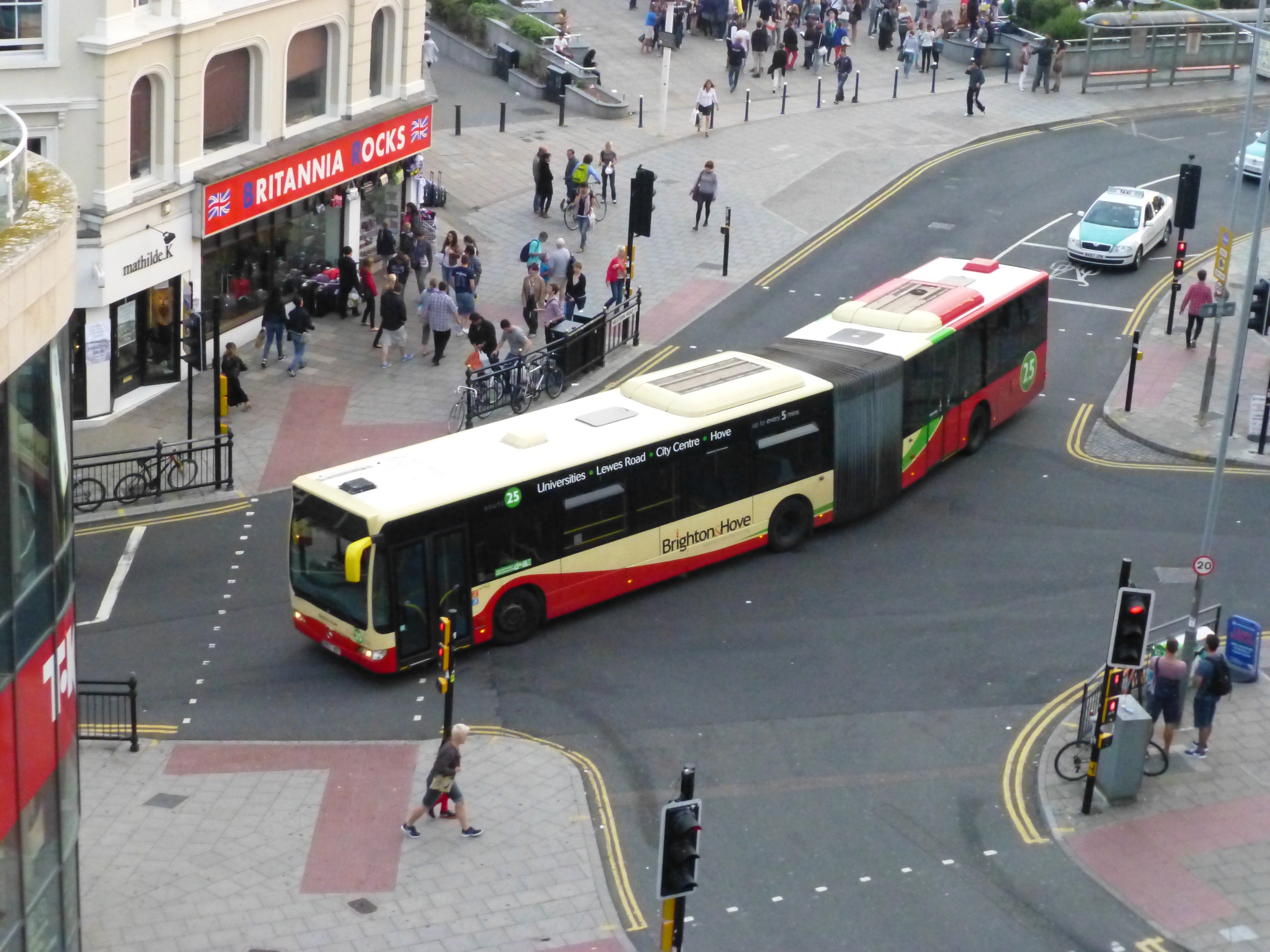
An articulated Mercedes-Benz Citaro, bending as it turns a corner

An articulated vehicle is a vehicle which has a permanent or semi-permanent coupling in its construction. This coupling works as a large pivot joint, allowing it to bend and turn more sharply. There are many kinds, from heavy equipment to buses, trams and trains. Steam locomotives were sometimes articulated so the driving wheels could pivot around corners.

In a broader sense, any vehicle towing a trailer (including a semi-trailer) could be described as articulated (which comes from the Latin word articulus, "small joint"). In the UK, an articulated lorry is the combination of a tractor and a trailer, abbreviated to "artic". In the US, it is called a semi-trailer truck, tractor-trailer or semi-truck, an eighteen-wheeler or simply a "semi" and is not necessarily considered articulated.

== Types ==
=== Buses ===
Buses are articulated to allow for a much longer bus that can still navigate within the turning radius of a normal bus. Most buses have one articulation, but some have two.

=== Trucks ===
In the UK, tractor unit and trailer combinations are referred to as articulated lorries, or "artics".

=== Trains and rail ===
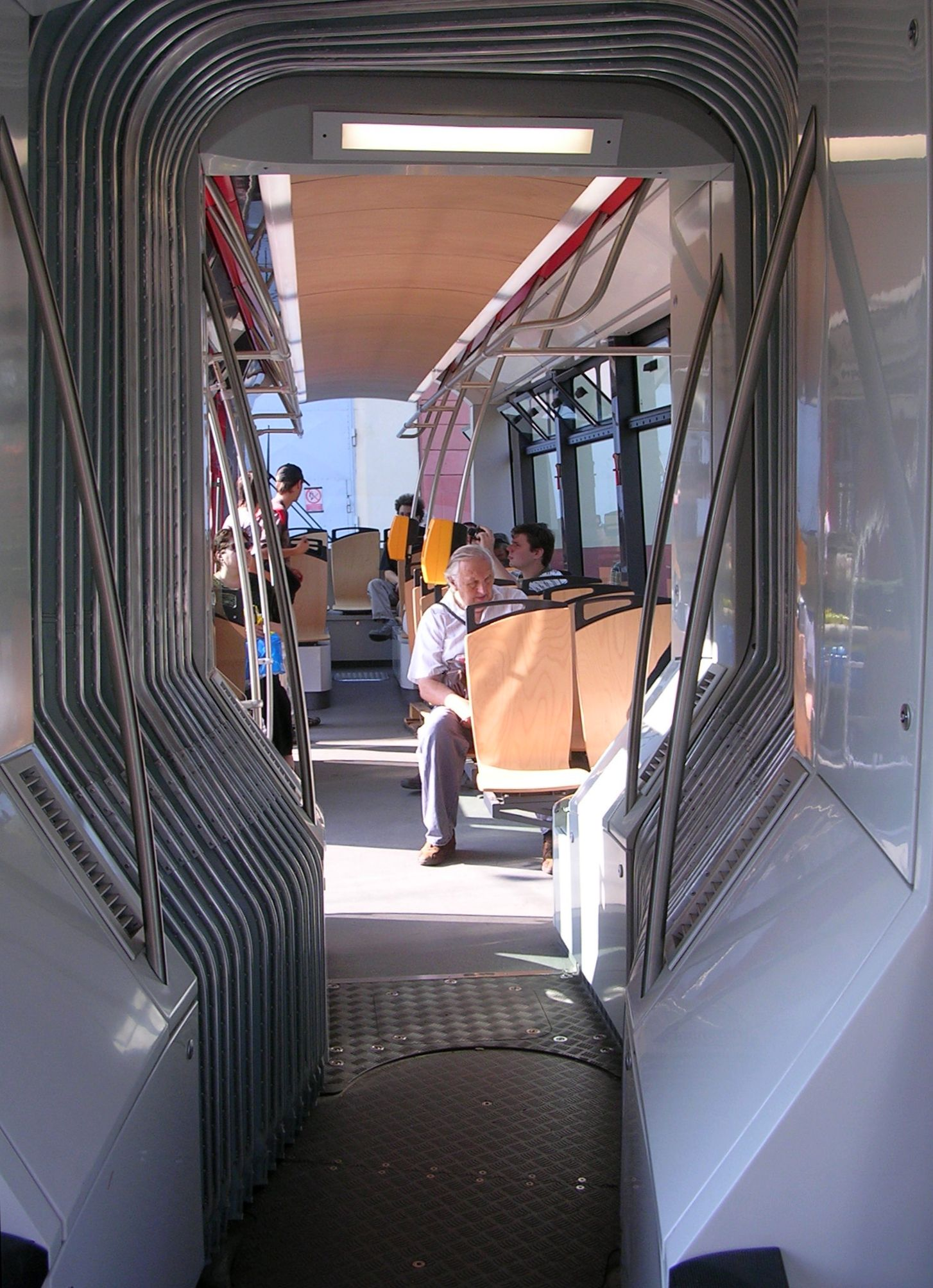
Interior of an articulated tram, showing the pivoting floor and concertina gangway connection

Many train cars are made with articulated connections, sharing a common truck between two cars. This reduces costs, weight, vibration and noise; and also enables higher speed running. One of the first examples of articulated railway carriages were used by the London & North Eastern Railway (LNER) in Great Britain on its London Suburban Trains in the mid-1920s; this rolling stock was designed by Nigel Gresley and built at the LNER's Doncaster Works. The four set "Quad-arts" were one of the very earliest articulated trains, this innovation was to save space. Although not the same as modern high speed trains where all the carriages share common bogies, they are an early form of the now more common design.

Trams and light rail vehicles have been made with articulated designs since the 1950s. Articulated trams, were invented and first used by the Boston Elevated Railway in 1912–13. This was instead of using trailers or multiple units, which had been attempted in the early 1900s. The articulated design allows passengers (and fare inspectors) to move the entire length of the vehicle, whether stopped or in motion.

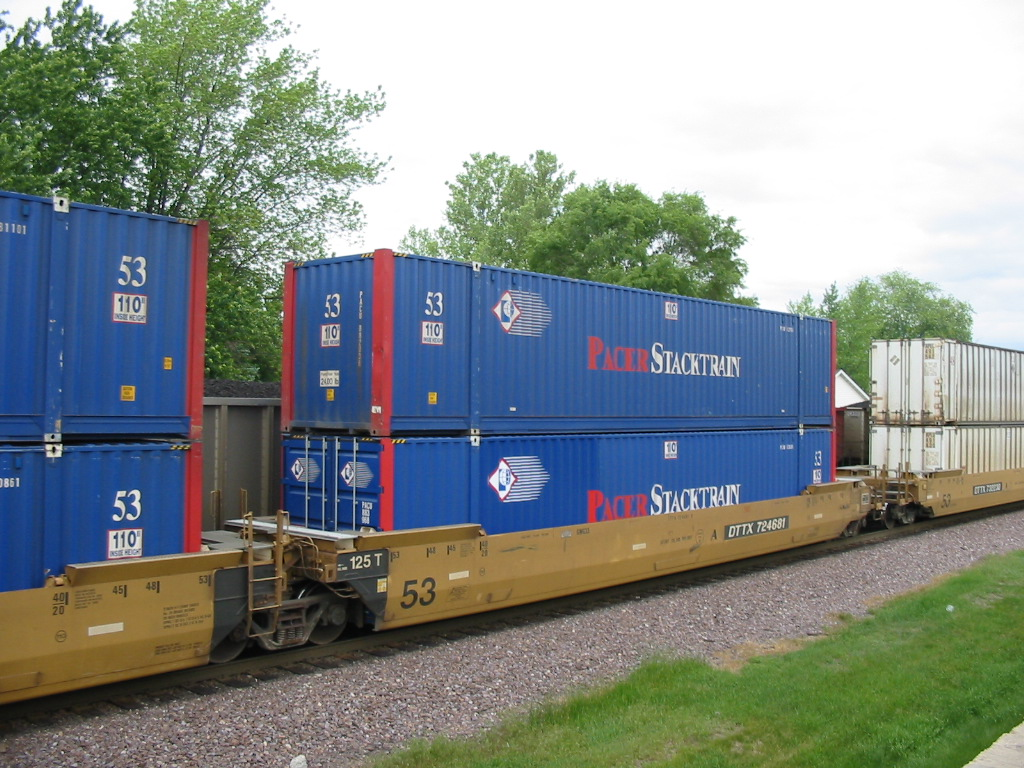
Articulated well cars with containers

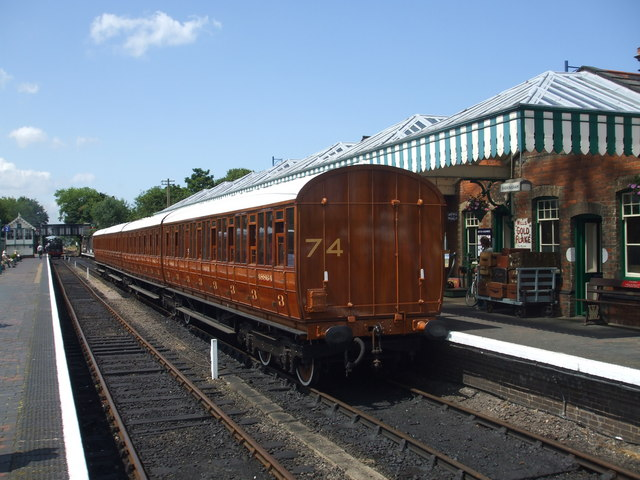
London and North Eastern Railway articulated train from 1924

=== Heavy equipment ===
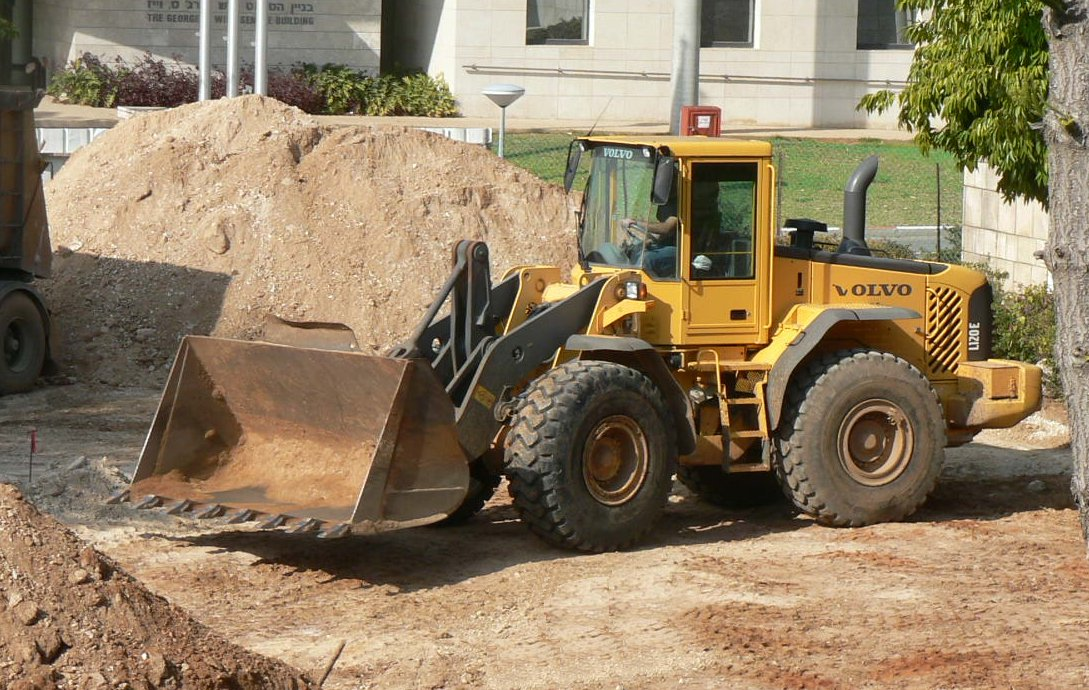
Volvo front loader on which the front portion pivots for turning

Front loaders, graders, dump trucks and other vehicles have been made with articulated joints to greatly reduce their turning radius and make a single track when making a turn in a soft surface like mud or sand. (the rear wheels follow the front wheel trajectory) The most common models of articulated haulers are Caterpillar, Volvo, and Terex trucks ranging in tonnage from 25 to 40 ton.

=== Military vehicles ===
Some military vehicles, including the United States Armed Forces' M561 Gama Goat and the Swedish Bandvagn 206 were engineered with an articulated body for rough terrain capability.

=== Watercraft ===
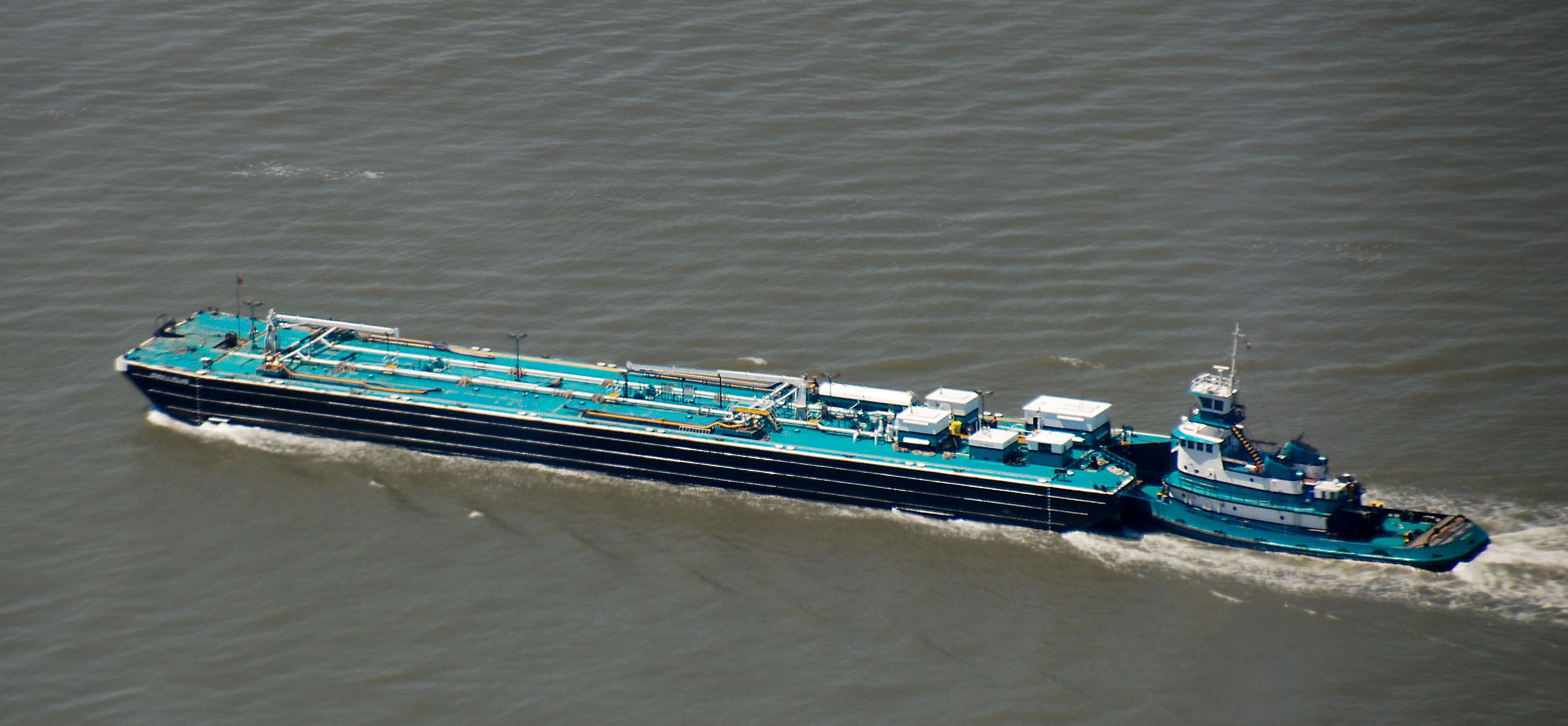
Tug and barge connected

The integral unit, or integrated tug and barge (ITB), comprises specially designed vessels that lock together in such a rigid and strong method as to be certified as such by authorities (classification societies) such as the American Bureau of Shipping, Lloyd's Register of Shipping, Indian Register of Shipping, Det Norske Veritas or several others. These units stay combined under virtually any sea conditions and the "tugs" usually have poor sea-keeping designs for navigation without their "barges" attached. Vessels in this category are legally considered to be ships rather than tugboats and barges and must be staffed accordingly. These vessels must show navigation lights compliant with those required of ships rather than those required of tugboats and vessels under tow.

Articulated tug and barge (ATB) units also use mechanical means to connect to their barges. ATBs generally use Intercon and Bludworth connecting systems. ATBs are generally staffed as a large tugboat, with between seven and nine crew members. The typical American ATB operating on the east coast, per custom, displays navigational lights of a towing vessel pushing ahead, as described in the '72 COLREGS.

== See also ==
- Dolly (trailer)
- Fifth wheel coupling
- Jackknifing
- Road train
- Semi-trailer
- Semi-trailer truck
- Slack action
- Trackless train
- Trailer bus
