= Truck sleeper =

Compartment in a tractor unit for rest or sleeping

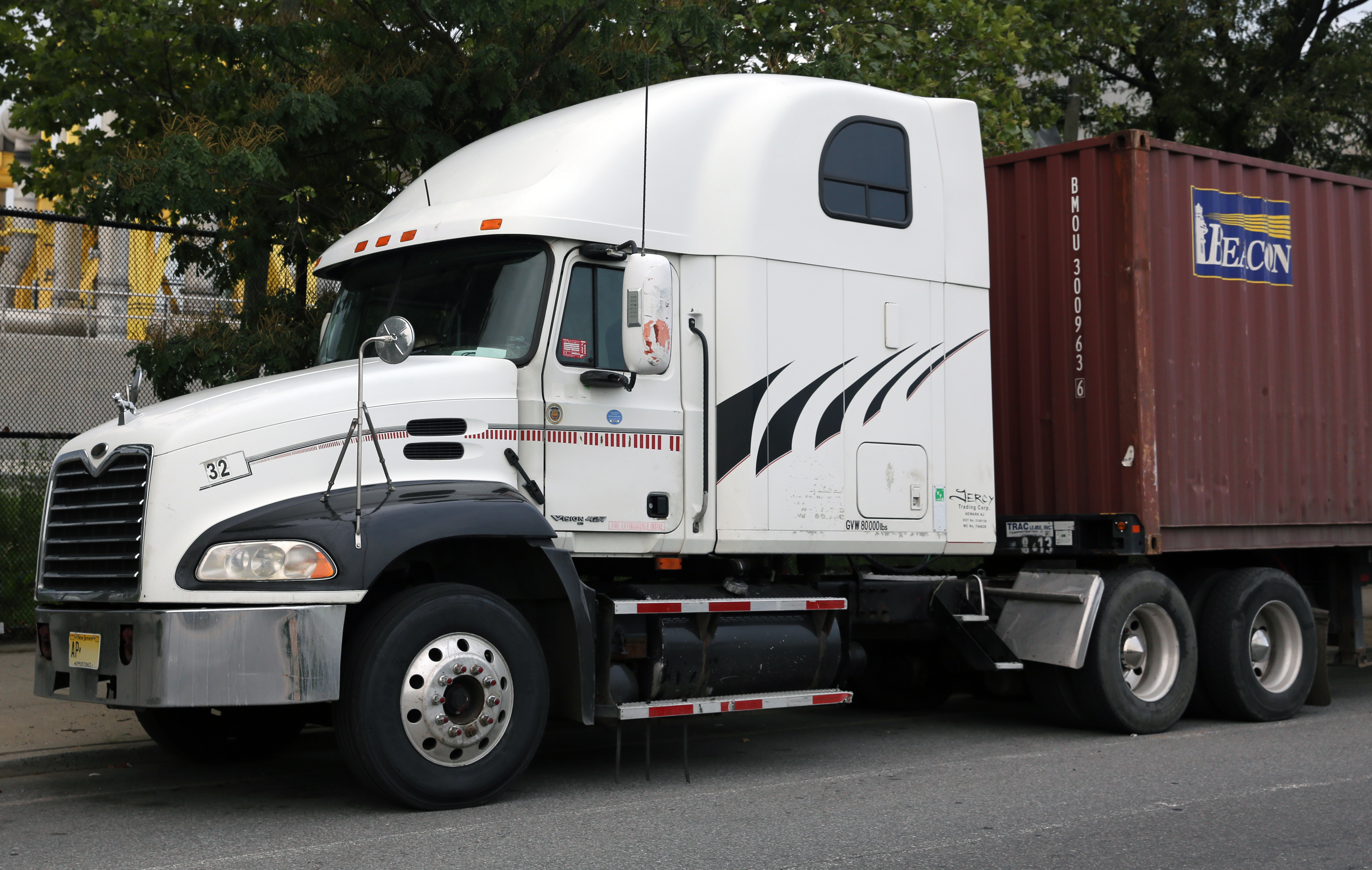
Sleeper compartment behind driver's compartment in a Mack Vision semi-trailer truck

A truck sleeper or sleeper cab is a compartment attached behind the cabin of a tractor unit used for rest or sleeping.

== Origin ==
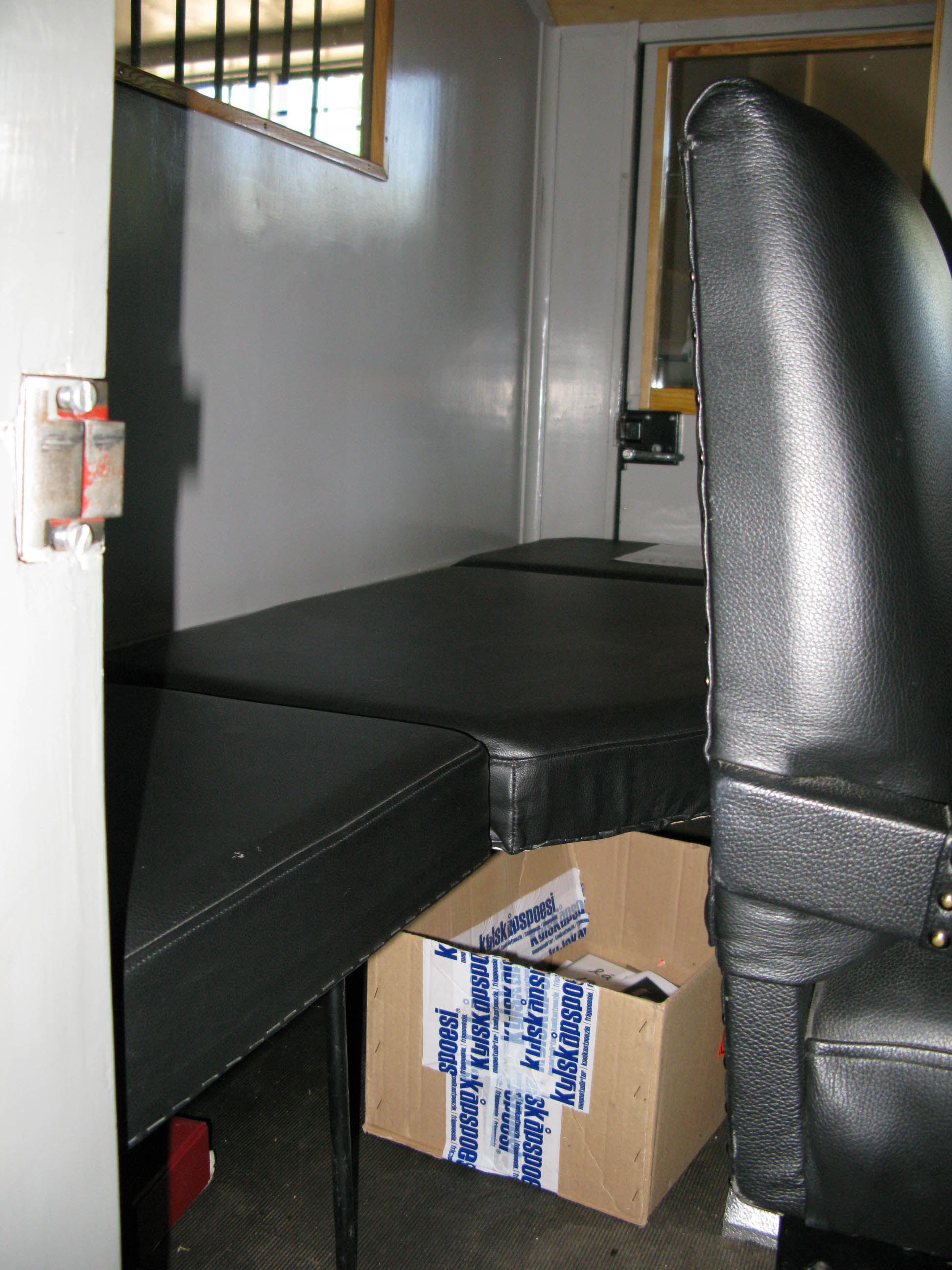
Early (1933) sleeper cab bed

In many countries, drivers are subject to work-time regulations which limit the amount of time they can drive before taking a mandated minimum rest period. Many drivers chose to sleep in the cab or cabin of their trucks rather than pay for a roadside motel. Truck manufacturers took notice of this and began developing tractor units with extended cabs to provide a sleeping area for drivers. Work-time regulations apply in the United States, Europe, Australia and in other parts of the world.

== Sleeper cabins ==
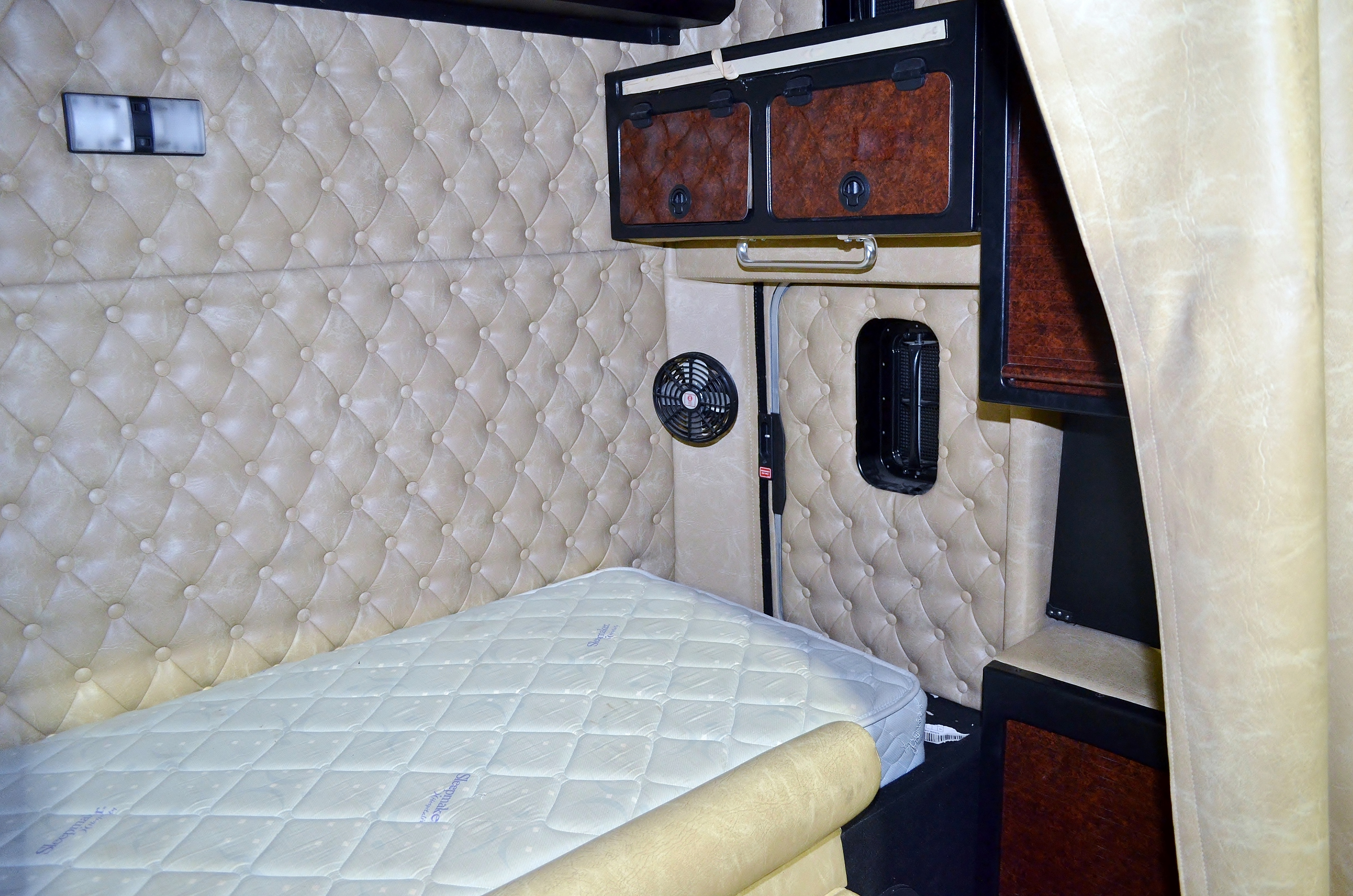
2010s sleeper cab interior

Sleeping berths came into use as early as the 1920s, but they were often unsafe and uncomfortable. They nonetheless allowed owner-operators to spend months at a time on the road, often driving in teams of two (one drove while the other slept). With this successful formula, drivers began making requests to truck manufacturers for larger and larger sleeping cabins. Manufacturers began catering to owner operators who requested greater luxury. Sleepers were initially developed without comfort in mind at 18 to 24 in (457 to 610 mm). They quickly grew to 36 to 48 in (914 to 1,219 mm) with long-haul drivers in mind. Their size came to be regulated in the US in the 1950s but length restrictions were removed in the 1980s. Custom truck sleepers vary in size in modern trucks from 36 in (914 mm) to the massive 230 in (5,842 mm). Custom sleepers come equipped with many of the amenities of modern RVs. By 2000, approximately 70% of new trucks manufactured in the US included sleeper berths.
