= Gama Goat =

M561 Gama Goat
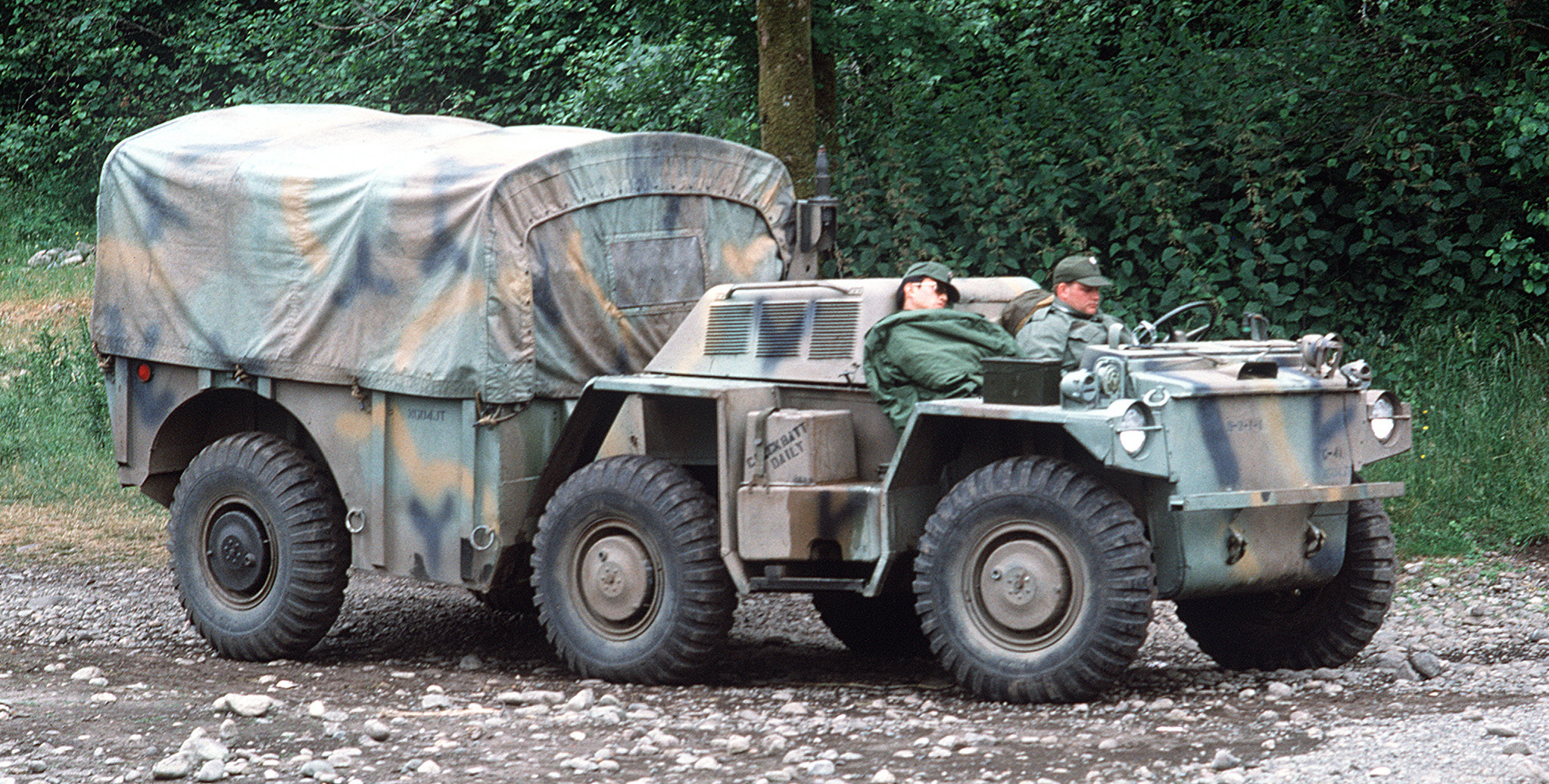
- Type: 6×6 Cargo vehicle
- Place of origin: United States

Service history
- In service: 1970s–1990s
- Used by: United States and Mexico
- Wars: Vietnam War

Production history
- Designer: Chance-Vought Aircraft
- Designed: 1962–1966
- Manufacturer: CONDEC
- Unit cost: $13,281
- Produced: 1969–1973
- No. built: 14,274
- Variants: M792

Specifications
- Mass: 7,275 lb (3,300 kg)
- Length: 227 in (5.8 m)
- Width: 84 in (2.1 m)
- Height: 91 in (2.3 m)
- Crew: 1
- Engine: Detroit Diesel 3-53; 159 cu in (2.61 L) Diesel I3; 101 hp (75 kW), 217 lbf⋅ft (294 N⋅m)
- Suspension: Wheel 6×6
- Operational range: 420 mi (680 km)
- Maximum speed: 56 mph (90 km/h)

The Gama Goat was a six-wheel drive semi-amphibious off-road vehicle originally developed for use by the US military in the Vietnam War. The Goat uses an articulated chassis, so that from distance it appears to be a four-wheel drive vehicle pulling a two-wheel trailer, but it is a single six-wheel vehicle with a four-wheel steering arrangement with the front and rear wheels turning in opposite directions. It was famous for its ability to travel over exceptionally rough and muddy terrain.

The vehicle's nickname came from two sources: "Gama" from the name of the inventor of its powered articulated joint, Roger Gamaunt, and "Goat" for its mountain goat-like off-road ability. Its military designation was M561, 6×6 tactical 1¼-ton truck. There was also an ambulance version known as the M792. The vehicle was replaced by a variety of Commercial Utility Cargo Vehicles (CUCVs) and Humvees.

== History ==
The concept for the vehicle came when the French Army reported that the United States Army trucks provided to them were woefully inadequate for the terrain in Vietnam. In 1959, Advanced Research Projects Agency (ARPA) (now known as DARPA) funded a research project called Project "Agile" to develop a new tactical truck for the Southeast Asia theatre, as well as other projects of interest to the then-looming Vietnam War.

Of 50 companies solicited for XM561 proposals, six entered the competition, including Clark, General Motors and LeTourneau Technologies, but on 15 March 1963, the research & development contract was awarded to Chance Vought division of LTV Aerospace, Dallas, Texas, best known for their combat aircraft (though, actually the company did have some experience in designing ground vehicles, particularly, a predecessor of Gama Goat, but they didn't have the truck assembly lines and production experience comparable to those of the mentioned car manufacturers). The principal competitor to the Goat was a tracked XM571 Articulated Utility Carrier developed by Canadair Ltd. of Montreal (yet another aerospace company,) which eventually lost the contest. The research and development contract for the Goat was completed by LTV at cost of about $8.7 million, over three times more expensive than when it had been awarded.

The vehicle weighed almost three times as much as originally requested by the military and specified by the operational requirements (2,500 lb or 1,100 kg). Field testing had not been completed before the mass production order had been issued. During the field tests, it had not been able to go 20,000 miles (32,000 km) without a breakdown.

Final construction of the vehicles was conducted by the Consolidated Diesel Electric Company (CONDEC) at their factory in Charlotte, North Carolina (on 11 June 1968, the Army awarded them a 3-year contract for 15,274 vehicles, 13,516 Army and 1,758 Marine Corps, at a total price of about $132.1 million, on the same day Detroit Diesel Division of General Motors received $30 million 3-year contract for the engines). CONDEC also had factories in Schenectady, New York, where the Gama Goat was originally manufactured, and in Greenwich, Connecticut, where the parts for the Gama Goat were produced. In the early 1960s, the company moved to Waterbury, Connecticut for a few years, then closed their plants in New York and Connecticut to move to Charlotte, North Carolina for cheaper labor and facilities.

The Gama Goat was replaced in the late 1980s by a variety of CUCVs and "Humvees" (HMMWV).

== Description ==
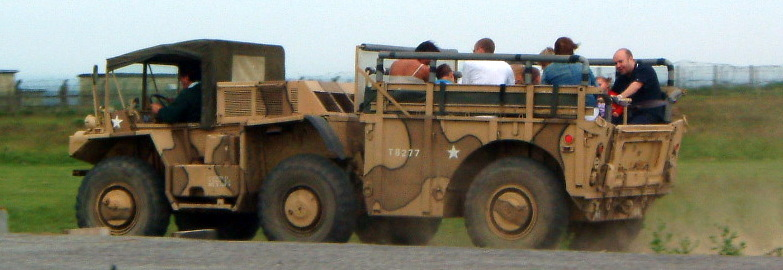
Gama Goat ride at the Muckleburgh Collection 2005

Overall, some 14,274 Gama Goats were built at a cost of US$8,000 each (1965 dollars; equivalent to $79,823 in 2024); this was considered quite high at the time. 12,516 were slated for the US Army and 1,758 for the USMC. While the Gama Goat had exceptional off-road ability, its quirky steering made it hard to handle on pavement, and its tendency to flounder in amphibious operations required drivers to have special training in order to operate it. This meant that it could not be the "general purpose" vehicle the Army had hoped for, and production was halted after the original contract expired.

The air-cooled engine used in the original prototypes overheated in use, and was replaced in the production vehicles with a liquid-cooled Detroit 3-53 Diesel engine. Due to the high-intensity noise from the two-stroke Diesel engine, the drivers required hearing protection. The double hull construction and complex articulated drivetrain made maintenance difficult (the lubrication order alone took around six hours). In service in Vietnam, Gama Goats would often be sent out ahead of other vehicles in order to arrive at their destination at the same time.

While technically listed as amphibious, the Gama Goat's swimming capability was limited to smooth water crossings of ponds, canals and streams due to the very low freeboard and the lack of a propeller. Propulsion in the water was supplied by the six spinning wheels, and bilge pumps were standard equipment. Drivers had to remember to close the hull's drain openings before swimming the vehicles. Some models had extra equipment installed that made them too heavy to swim, such as heavy-duty winches, communications shelters that made them top heavy, or radar gear.

It was designed to be air-transportable and droppable by parachute.

== Typical problems and malfunctions ==
In May 1972 Fort Hood cited the following problems as a result of examining 566 vehicles:

Typical problems chart
Problem area	Number of vehicles with faults
Defective brake drums, seals, “O” rings	23
Water in differentials	35
Wheel brake cylinder leaking	41
Defective signal lights	20
Gear box low on oil	354
Transmission leaking at dowel pins top cover	19
Loose wheel bearings	356
Transfer case oil pump inoperable (no prime—some with Teflon tape in ball checks)	188
Transfer case jumps out of high range (improper manufacture of main shaft splines)	10
Vent pipe missing on rear differential	11
Defective seat, tube, spindle assembly (brass brake line seat)	42
Hood hinge broken	10

== Additional specifications ==
=== Articulation ===
- Roll at center axle: ± 15 degrees
- Roll at rear axle: ± 30 degrees
- Pitch at rear axle: ± 40 degrees
- Wall climb (vertical): 18 in (460 mm)
- Angle of approach: 62 degrees
- Angle of departure: 45 degrees
- Hump angle: 140 degrees

=== Suspension ===
- Front and rear independent coil springs at each wheel
- Center single leaf spring and swing axle

=== Steering system ===
- Type: Mechanical front and rear simultaneously operated
- Steering ratio: 24:1
- Turning radius: 29 ft (8.8 m)

== Variants ==
- M561

- Cargo / personnel (eight troops) carrier
- TOW ATGM team carrier (originally intended to be a dedicated Anti-Tank variant with its own TOW launching platform)
- Communications (separate shelter installed in the cargo compartment)
- Mortar carrier
- Radar (counter-mortar/artillery system)
- Radar (AN/MPQ-49 Forward Area Alerting Radar)

- M60 Machine gun and mount on passenger fender
- M792

- Ambulance

== Operators ==
- Mexico

=== Former operators ===
- United States

== See also ==
- List of the United States military vehicles by supply catalog designation
- List of the United States military vehicles by model number
