= AN/MPQ-49 Forward Area Alerting Radar =

US lightweight early warning radar

The AN/MPQ-49 Forward Area Alerting Radar (FAAR) is a lightweight early warning radar system consisting of the AN/TPQ-43 radar, AN/TPX-50 Mark XII IFF receiver, a 5 kW generator set, and a Gama Goat providing mobility.

In accordance with the Joint Electronics Type Designation System (JETDS), the "AN/MPQ-49" designation represents the 49th design of an Army-Navy electronic device for ground mobile radar combination equipment. The JETDS system also now is used to name all Department of Defense electronic systems.

== Development ==
FAAR was developed by the US Army in the 1960s to support their field anti-aircraft weapons, the M48 Chaparral and M163 Vulcan Air Defense System, deployed through the 1970s and 80's, and retired from active service in 1991. FAAR units have been used for drug trafficking surveillance in Palm Beach, and since September 1991, offered for sale to foreign users.

The AN/TPQ-43 radar was mounted on a boom that extended upward from the rear of the Gama Goat's trailer. It is a pulse doppler radar that operates in the D band and has a range of about 20 km. Data from the radar was generally not used at the radar site itself, but broadcast over FM radio to the "Target Alerting Data Display Set" (TADDS), a small battery-powered receiver and display unit. Field units, including the Chaparral, Vulcan and FIM-43 Redeye units, used the TADDS as an early-warning display, aiming their optically-guided weapons in the general direction it provided.

FAAR is transported by a Gama Goat and set up behind the front lines. The generator is towed behind the Gama Goat's own trailer, and then detached and operated at a distance from the trailer. The entire system is easily air-transportable.

== See also ==
- AN/MPQ-64 Sentinel
- List of radars
- List of military electronics of the United States
