= Large goods vehicle =

Category of vehicle

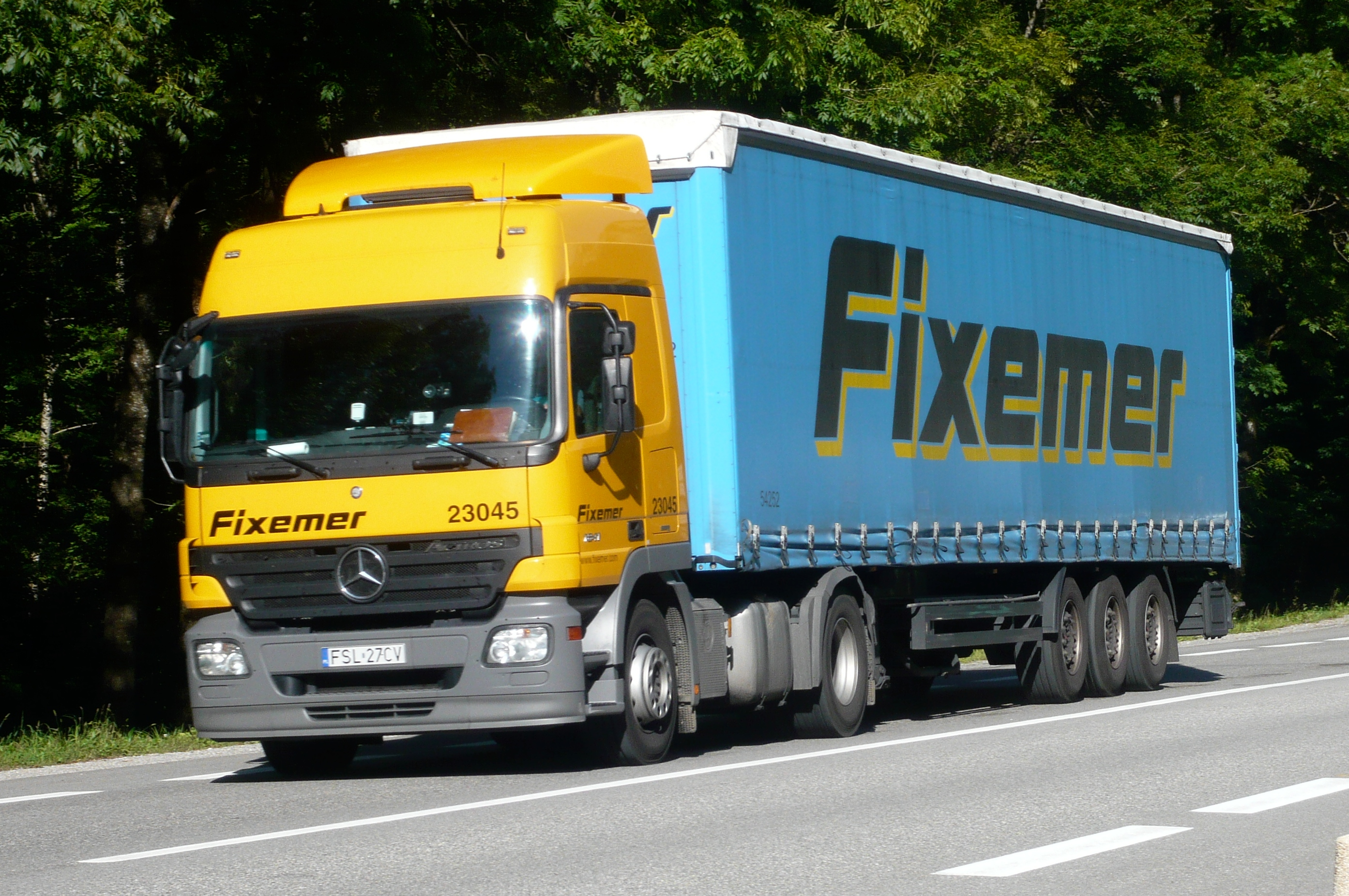
The Mercedes-Benz Actros is an example of a large goods vehicle

A large goods vehicle (LGV), or heavy goods vehicle (HGV), in the European Union (EU) is any lorry with a gross combination mass (GCM) of over 3,500 kg (7,700 lb). Sub-category N2 is used for vehicles between 3,500 kg and 12,000 kg (26,000 lb) and N3 for all goods vehicles over 12,000 kg as defined in Directive 2001/116/EC. The term medium goods vehicle is used within parts of the UK government to refer to goods vehicles of between 3,500 and 7,500 kg which according to the EU are also "large goods vehicles."

Commercial carrier vehicles of up to 3,500 kg are referred to as light commercial vehicles and come into category N1.

To cross country borders in the EU, LGVs must not exceed 44 tonnes laden weight or longer than 18.75 m (61.5 ft), but longer and heavier vehicles (LHVs) are used within some EU countries, where they are known as Gigaliner, EuroCombi, EcoLiner, innovative commercial vehicle, mega-truck, and under other names. They are typically 25.25 metres (82.8 ft) long and weigh up to 70 tonnes, and the implications of allowing them to cross boundaries was considered in 2011.

== Driver licensing ==
=== European Union ===
It is necessary to have an appropriate European driving license to drive a large goods vehicle in the European Union. There are four categories:

- Category C1 allows the holder to drive a large goods vehicle with a maximum authorized mass (gross vehicle weight) of up to 7,500 kg (16,500 lb) with a trailer having a maximum authorized mass of up to 750 kg (1,650 lb). This license can be obtained at 18 years of age and is the replacement for the HGV Class 3 in the UK (the old HGV Class 3 being any two-axle goods vehicle over 7,500 kg).
- Category C1+E allows the holder to drive a large goods vehicle with a maximum authorized mass (gross vehicle weight) of up to 7,500 kg with a trailer over 750 kg maximum authorized mass, provided that the maximum authorized mass of the trailer does not exceed the unladen mass of the vehicle being driven, and provided that the combined maximum authorized mass of both the vehicle and trailer does not exceed 12,000 kg (26,000 lb).
- Category C allows the holder to drive any large goods vehicle with a trailer having a maximum authorized mass of up to 750 kg. This is effectively the new GV Class 2 in the UK, the old HGV Class 2 being any rigid goods vehicle with more than two axles. A driver can commence training for a Category C license from 18 years old.
- Category C+E: allows the holder to drive any large goods vehicle with a trailer having a maximum authorized mass of over 750 kg. This license could only be obtained after six months' experience with a Class 2 truck, but more recently the law has changed so that it is now possible to take the tests back-to-back (Category C first then C+E the following week). This is the new Class 1 licence.

Operator Licensing Operation of heavy goods vehicles for commercial reasons in European Union requires an operator's license. This allows member states to regulate companies operating these vehicles enforcing number of safety requirements which includes driver's hours regulations and vehicle safety standards.

=== UK ===
Drivers who passed a Category B (car) test before 1 January 1997 will have received Categories C1 and C1+E (Restriction Code 107: not more than 8,250 kg [18,190 lb]) through the Implied Rights issued by the Driver and Vehicle Licensing Agency (DVLA) (more commonly known as Grandfather Rights).

All UK LGV license holders must undergo a strict medical examination and eye test on application at age 45 and every 5 years thereafter. On reaching 65 years of age, a medical examination must be performed on an annual basis.

=== Canada ===
In the Canadian province of Ontario, drivers holding a Full Class AZ license can drive any truck/tractor trailer combination, a combination of motor vehicle and towed vehicles where the towed vehicles exceed a total gross weight of 4,600 kg (10,100 lb) and has air brakes, or a vehicle pulling double trailers. Drivers holding a Class B (school bus), C (regular bus) or D (heavy truck) license can drive a truck with a gross weight or registered gross weight exceeding 11,000 kg (24,000 lb) or any truck and trailer combination exceeding 11,000 kg gross weight or registered gross weight provided the towed vehicle is not over 4,600 kg.

=== United States ===
Driving and operating a large goods vehicle in the United States requires a commercial license, where Classes A and B apply.

Class B is where drivers are permitted to operate trucks at a Gross Vehicular Weight Rating (GWVR) of 26,000 pounds (13 tons) or better, and without trailers.

Class A is where drivers are permitted to operate trucks at a Gross Vehicular Weight Rating (GWVR) of 26,000 pounds (13 tons) or better and a trailer weighing 10,000 pounds (5 tons) or more.

Requirements to apply for a commercial license in the states is that a participant must be 18 years of age (increased to 21 if out of birth state), become a legit U.S. citizen, have a valid-lower ranked driver's license, pass a USDOT physical exam, Complete Entry Level Driver Training (ELDT) in any educational field, pass a written or online CDL test, and pass an additional road skill test that features a two-and-a-half-hour test with sections on inspection, parking skills, and road driving.

=== New Zealand ===
There are four classes of heavy vehicle license: 2, 3, 4 and 5. Classes 1 and 6 are for light vehicles and motorcycles, respectively. The classes describe the characteristics of the vehicle, the weight limits, and the maximum number of axles.

Drivers must begin with a class 2 (medium rigid vehicle) learner license before progressing to a class 3 medium combination vehicle license or a class 4 heavy rigid vehicle license. A class 5 (heavy combination vehicle) license can only be earned after driving with a class 4 license for a specific timeframe (depending on age) or completing an accelerated course.

As New Zealand has a graduated driver licensing system, drivers must pass a theory test before being allowed to drive on the road. They can then drive with a supervisor for six months followed by a practical test, or they can complete an accelerated heavy vehicle course.

== Safety ==
LGVs and their drivers are covered by strict regulations in many jurisdictions. For example, to improve safety, limit weight to that which will not excessively wear the transport infrastructure (roads, bridges, etc.). The heavy weight of these vehicles leads to severe consequences for other road users in crashes; they are over-involved in fatal crashes, and in a 2013 study in London, were found to cause a disproportionate number of the annual casualty toll of cyclists.

== Manufacturers ==
Current

- Daimler AG with subsidiaries
  - BharatBenz
  - Mercedes-Benz
  - Freightliner
  - Mitsubishi Fuso
  - Western Star
- Paccar with subsidiaries
  - DAF
  - Kenworth
  - Leyland Trucks
  - Peterbilt
- Traton Group with subsidiaries
  - MAN Truck & Bus
  - Navistar International
  - Scania Trucks & Buses
  - Volkswagen Caminhões e Ônibus
- Volvo Group with subsidiaries
  - Dongfeng Commercial Vehicles (45%)
  - Mack Trucks
  - Renault Trucks
  - Volvo Trucks
- Ford
- Hyundai

== Ordinary goods vehicle ==
In the United Kingdom, the related term Ordinary Goods Vehicle (OGV) is used for medium and large goods vehicles. The Department for Transport COBA 7 scheme divides this into OGV1 (with up to three axles) and OGV2 (with four or more axles).

== See also ==
- Commercial vehicle
- Light commercial vehicle
- Light truck
- Longer Heavier Vehicle
- Road train
- Semi-trailer truck
