= Fifth-wheel coupling =

Link between a semi-trailer and the towing truck

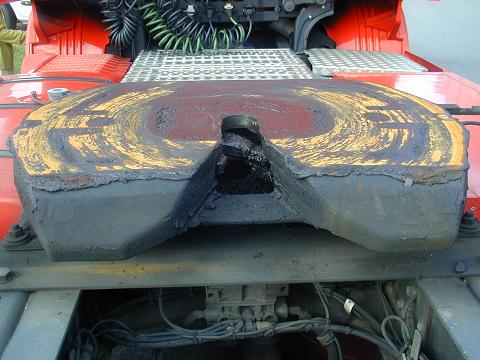
The fifth wheel on a tractor unit, rear view

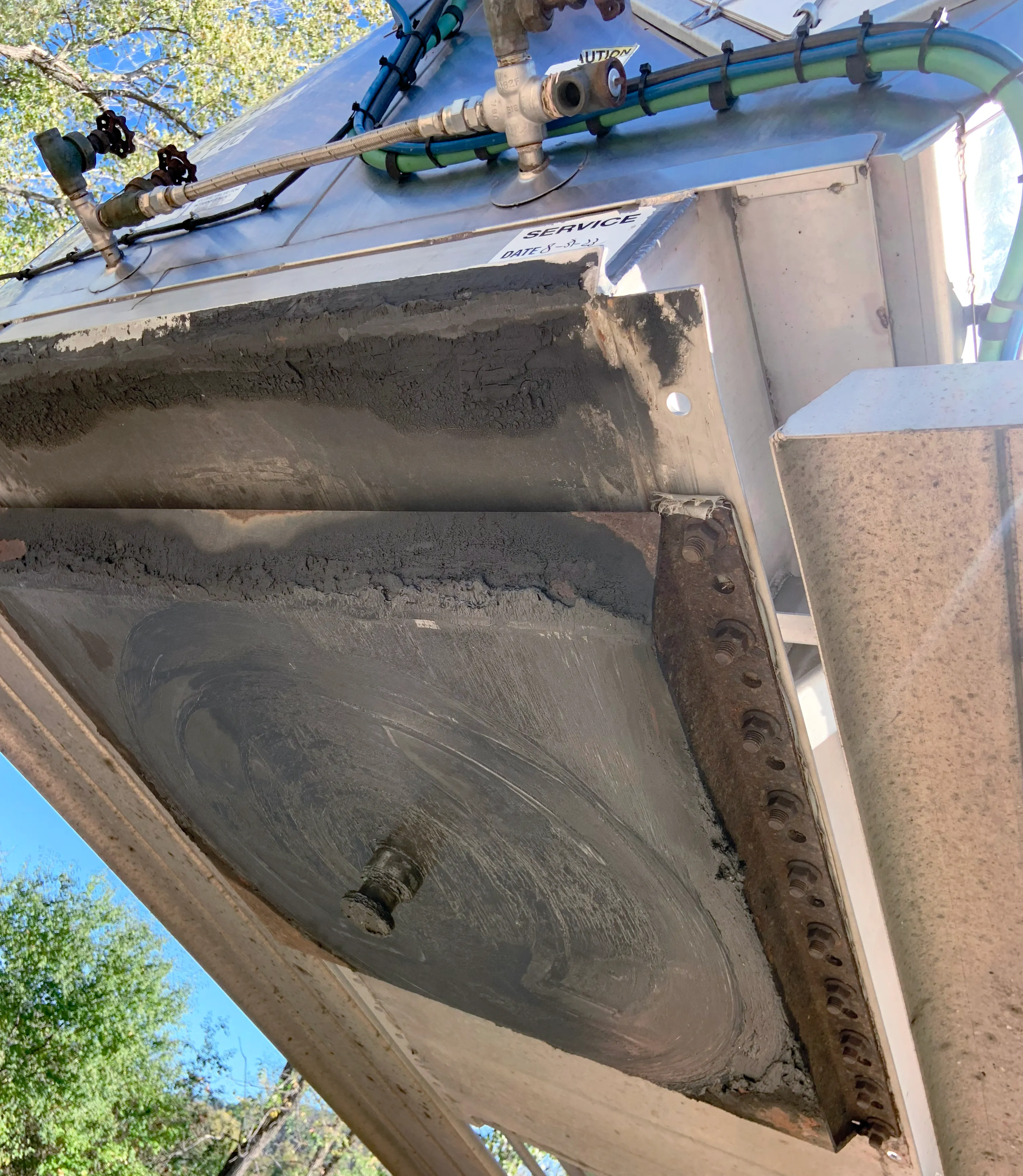
Kingpin on the bottom of the trailer

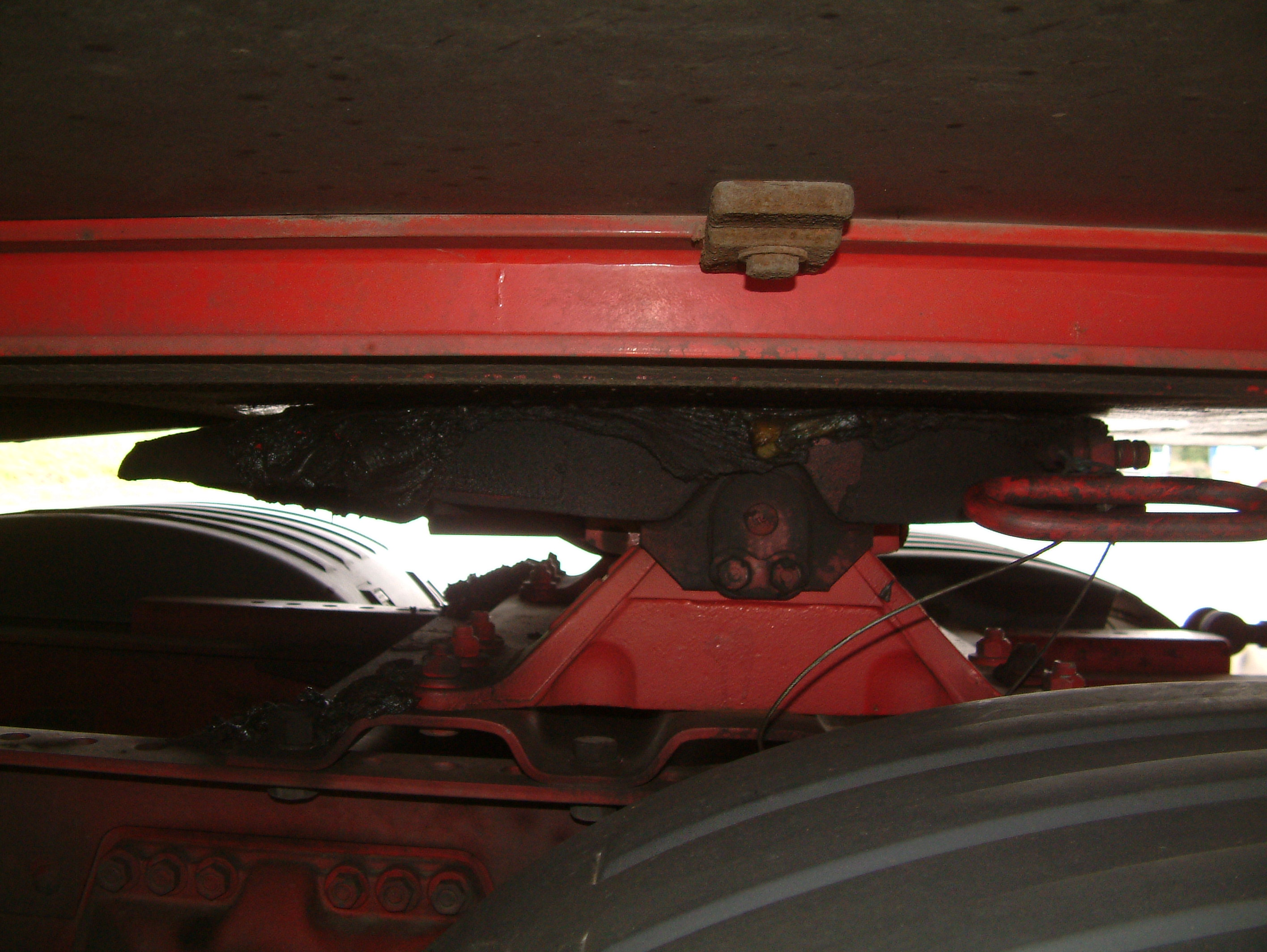
A fifth wheel, already coupled, side view

The fifth-wheel coupling provides the link between a semi-trailer and the towing truck, tractor unit, leading trailer or dolly. The coupling consists of a kingpin, a 2-or-3 1/2-inch-diameter (50.8 or 88.9 mm) vertical steel pin protruding from the bottom of the front of the semi-trailer, and a horseshoe-shaped coupling device called a fifth wheel on the rear of the towing vehicle. As the connected truck turns, the downward-facing surface of the semi-trailer (with the kingpin at the center) rotates against the upward-facing surface of the fixed fifth wheel, which does not rotate. To reduce friction, grease is applied to the surface of the fifth wheel. The configuration is sometimes called a turn-table in Australia and New Zealand, especially if it is a rotating ball-race-bearing type. The advantage of this type of coupling is towing stability.

Some camper trailers also use a fifth-wheel configuration, with the coupling installed in the bed of a pickup truck as a towing vehicle; "fifth wheel" is therefore sometimes used as a synonym for such campers.

== Origin ==
The term fifth wheel comes from a similar coupling used on four-wheel horse-drawn carriages and wagons. The device allowed the front axle assembly to pivot in the horizontal plane, to facilitate turning while preventing the vehicle from tipping over, which an axle alone might permit. A wheel would be placed on the rear frame section of the truck, which at the time had only four wheels, making the additional wheel the "fifth wheel". The trailer needed to be raised so that the trailer's pin would be able to drop into the central hole of the fifth wheel.

Fifth wheels were originally not a complete circle and were hand forged. When mass production of buggy parts began in the early 19th century, fifth wheels were among the first products to be made. There were a number of patents awarded for fifth-wheel design. Edward and Charles Everett, Quincy, Illinois patented a type of fifth wheel in 1850, followed by Gutches' metallic head block and fifth wheel in 1870 and Wilcox fifth wheel in 1905.

== Steam tractors with fifth-wheel ==
A Thornycroft steam tractor with articulated trailer competed in the 1898 heavy vehicle trials in Liverpool which took place from May 24 to May 28. Built by the Steam Carriage and Wagon Company of Chiswick, the trailer and tractor unit were connected by a turntable though the details of the coupling are not revealed apart from a schematic.

Another early example of the fifth wheel in a motorised vehicle was the Messrs T. Toward & Co Steam Motor Tractor that was exhibited at the Northumberland Agricultural Society Show in Newcastle upon Tyne in July 1898, and described in some detail in the September issue of the Automotor Journal. The tractor is shown towing a trailer (or 'lorry') "It will be observed that the fore-wheels of the latter are removed, the fore part of the body being carried on the rear end of the tractor, which is fitted with a turntable with an adjustable screwed spindle." "By this means the major portion of the load on the lorry can be transferred to the rear part of the tractor, and this increases the load on the rear wheels (the drivers) of the latter, and consequently the adhesion." They make the point that "The tractor system, of course, means in effect an articulated six-wheel vehicle". Drawing a trailer loaded with 30 passengers on 6 August 1898 it travelled the 14 miles (23 km) from Newcastle to Durham without a stop for water. After stopping at Market Place for 2 hours where it attracted a large crowd, it turned "nearly in its own length" and made the return journey without any problems on the hills between. The fifth wheel, or turntable, for these vehicles was a full disk, and is pictured in the September 1898 article. The September account also includes details of the delivery and successful testing of one of these vehicles for hauling loads of coal over the hilly roads in Morpeth.

== Martin Rocking Fifth Wheel ==
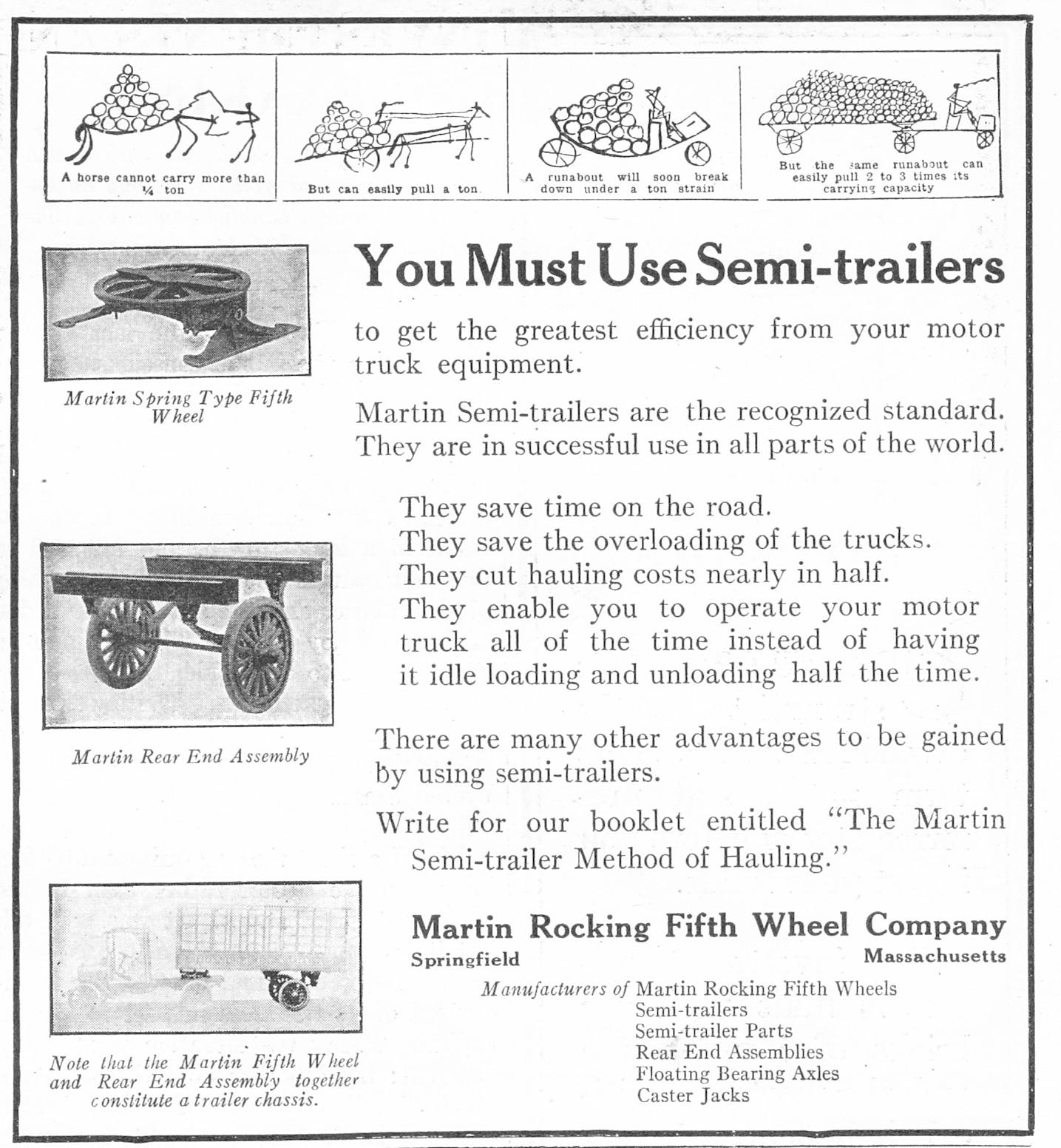
A 1920 advertisement for Martin Rocking Fifth Wheel

The invention of the fifth wheel for motorized trucks is often credited to Charles H. Martin of the Martin Rocking Fifth Wheel Co. in Massachusetts, who invented the device in 1915. It was submitted for patent in 1915 and finalized in 1916, with Herman Farr as inventor and Martin as assignee. When they formed the Martin Fifth Wheel company, Martin was president and Farr was named secretary. It is debatable whether the fifth wheel can be considered a milestone separate from the semi-trailer, given the purpose of the fifth wheel is to link the tractor and the trailer; indeed, trailers existed before Charles H. Martin introduced the Martin Rocking Fifth Wheel in 1915. At the time, the fifth wheel literally was a wheel that moved with the trailer—unlike today’s technology that secures a kingpin. What makes the fifth wheel so important is the ability it gave fleet owners to attach large trailers to tractors easily and safely and the freedom it gave them to switch out trailers. Without a fifth wheel, the modern distribution system would look quite different as drop-and-hook would not be easy. The semi-trailer increased the capacity of trucks, but it was the fifth wheel that brought the flexibility for drivers to keep moving while receivers unloaded the loads they just delivered.

The Fruehauf Trailer Corporation helped to make the Martin Rocking 5th Wheel a success by installing them on their popular new semi-trailer design. August Fruehauf invented the semi-trailer in 1914 with their own 5th wheel hitch. They adopted the Martin Rocking 5th wheel in 1916. By 1916 Fruehauf was producing semi-trailers in tandem with Federal Truck. These two Detroit companies also contracted with the military in WWI sending a convoy of supplies, men and equipment from Detroit to Norfolk, Virginia shipyards for travel to the front in Europe.

Fruehauf's success with semi-trailer sales surpassed the million dollar sales mark by 1920. Opening a branch in Chicago and later in Des Moines their trailers and hence, the Martin Rocking 5th Wheel became the top selling commercial vehicle of this era. Fruehauf's slogan, "A Horse can pull more than it can carry, so can a truck" became their advertising motto. Merchants, manufacturers and businesses in every industry clamored for a semi-trailer and the shuttle concept introduced by Fruehauf using one tractor truck and 2 or more semi-trailers.

Fruehauf used the Martin Rocking 5th Wheel up until at least 1919. Early that year, the manual coupler was introduced to the industry by Fruehauf and the jacks acting as front supports for the semi-trailer were supplanted by wheels, raised and lowered manually.

== Fruehauf automatic semi-trailer ==
In 1926, Fruehauf introduced the automatic semi-trailer in which the coupling and the uncoupling of the tractor were accomplished mechanically by the motion of the tractor. Fruehauf's introduction of the automatic semi-trailer was instantly recognized by transportation experts as a major contribution to the industry.

The automatic semi-trailer coupling patented by Fruehauf dominated the semi-trailer market until the Fruehauf Trailer Corporation's assets were sold in bankruptcy to Wabash National in 1997.

Another fifth wheel patent U.S. 2,053,812 was issued to Charles E. Bradshaw of Wellville, Virginia, filed March 18, 1936 and granted September 8, 1936. One third of that patent was assigned to Charles Martin, also of Wellville.

Modern fifth wheels allow the trailers to slide into the fifth wheel and lock into it very reliably when maintained and serviced properly. The engagement of the king pin into the fifth-wheel locking mechanism is the only means of connection between tractor and trailer; no other device or safety mechanism is used. Couplers and pintle hooks use safety chains in the event of a trailer separation while going down the road. Trailer-to-trailer connection can also be made by using fifth wheels; this creates a B-train.

== See also ==
- Drawbar (haulage)
- Trailer (vehicle) § Fifth wheel and gooseneck
- Ringfeder
- Tow hitch
- Tractor unit
