= Tractor unit =

Truck designed to tow semi-trailers

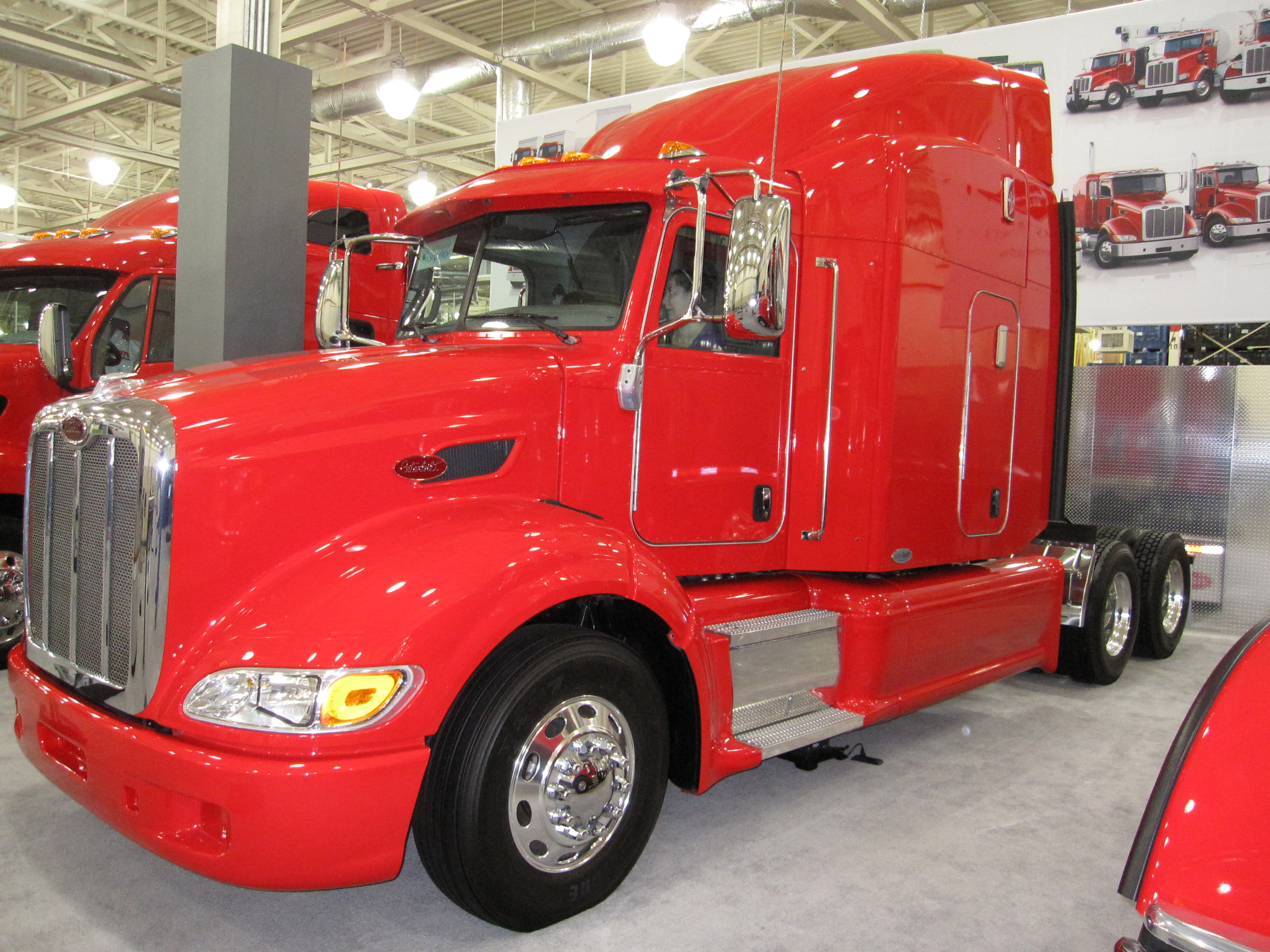
Peterbilt 386 sleeper-cab–style commercial 6×4 tractor unit

A tractor unit (Note: Also known as a truck unit, lorry unit, power unit, prime mover, ten-wheeler, semi-tractor, semi-truck, semi-lorry, big rig tractor, big rig truck or big rig lorry or simply a tractor, truck, lorry, semi, big rig or rig) is a characteristically heavy-duty tow vehicle that provides motive power for hauling a towed or trailered load. The largest such vehicles are similar to locomotives, which fall into two categories: heavy- and medium-duty military and commercial rear-wheel-drive semi-tractors that are used for hauling semi-trailers, and very heavy-duty typically off-road-capable, often 6×6, military and commercial tractor units, including ballast tractors.

It should not be confused with a tractor-trailer, which is a combination of a tractor unit and semi-trailer. A tractor unit describes only the tractor portion.

== Overview ==
1. tractor; tractor unit; 2. semi-trailer (detachable); 3. engine compartment; 4. cabin; 5. sleeper (not present in all trucks); 6. air dam; 7. fuel tanks; 8. fifth wheel coupling; 9. enclosed cargo space; 10. landing gear – legs for when semi-trailer is detached; 11. tandem axles

Tractor units typically have large-displacement diesel engines for power, durability, and economy; several axles; and a multi-ratio transmission (between 10 and 18 gears) for maximum flexibility in gearing.

The tractor–trailer combination distributes a load across multiple axles while being more maneuverable than an equivalently sized rigid truck. The most common trailer attachment system is a fifth-wheel coupling, allowing a rapid shift between trailers performing different functions, such as a bulk tipper and box trailer. Trailers containing differing cargos can be rapidly swapped between tractors, which eliminates downtime while a trailer is unloaded or loaded.

Drawbar couplings are also found, particularly in dedicated exceptionally heavy-duty ballast tractors and as a means to connect intermediate fifth-wheel dollies for pulling multiple semi-trailers.

Most tractor units are based on the chassis of a large truck (Class 8 in North America) minus the cargo body, with shorter frames used for cabovers and day-cab tractors, and longer frames used for sleeper cab tractors, to accommodate the longer cabin.

=== Electrification ===
Despite most tractor units being diesel powered, several manufacturers have begun experimenting and producing tractor units for short and regional-haul freight. These vehicles utilize large lithium-ion or lithium iron phosphate batteries. Electrification of semi-trucks remains a challenge, studies claim that charging stations for heavy duty EVs are heavily concentrated and can often equal to aggregated loads of thousands of households, which may jeopardize local electric grid when there are no large energy storage unit near the charger to act as buffer for the grid.

== Configurations ==
=== Cab types ===
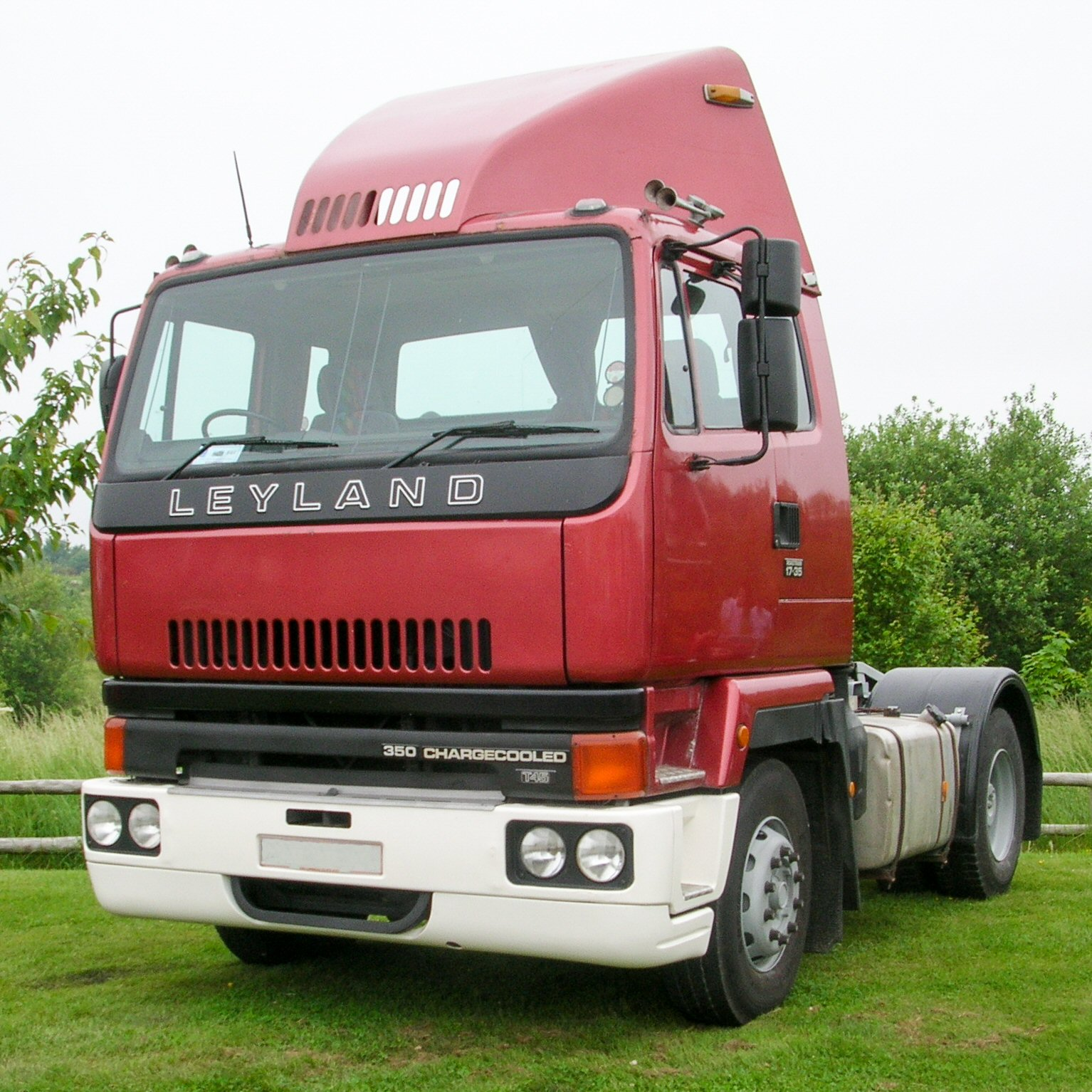
A Leyland T45 cab-over 4×2 tractor unit

There have been three common cab configurations used in tractors, two are still widely used.

1. The conventional "dog nose" has an engine and hood over the front axle in front of the cab, as in most automobiles. This style is almost universal in North America.
2. The cab over engine or cab forward "flat face" has a flat nose cab with the driver sitting in front of the front axle. Widely used in the EU and Japan, this style has the advantages of good vision and maneuverability and shorter cab length, at the expense of driver safety in case of an accident. In North America, this type of cab can be useful in rigid trucks, but has little advantage in tractors and is rarely used. EU rules (introduction of EU Regulation No. 2019/1892) have been relaxed since September 2021 to allow for a longer cab, where the additional length is used to improve aerodynamics and vulnerable road user safety.
3. A North American style cab over engine "bull nose", largely obsolete, had a flat nose cab located higher over the engine, with the driver sitting above the front axle. This allowed a sleeper compartment in a short tractor, and maximum wheelbase relative overall length, important for bridge formula weight restrictions. With the loosening of length restrictions in 1982 this style had limited applications, and is no longer manufactured for the US market. This style is still popular in Australia and New Zealand where length restrictions apply and it is used to maximise the capacity of both single trailer and B double configurations, and American company Kenworth still manufactures trucks in this style for this market. In Australia, both styles of cab over engine truck as well as conventionals are in common use.

=== Axles ===
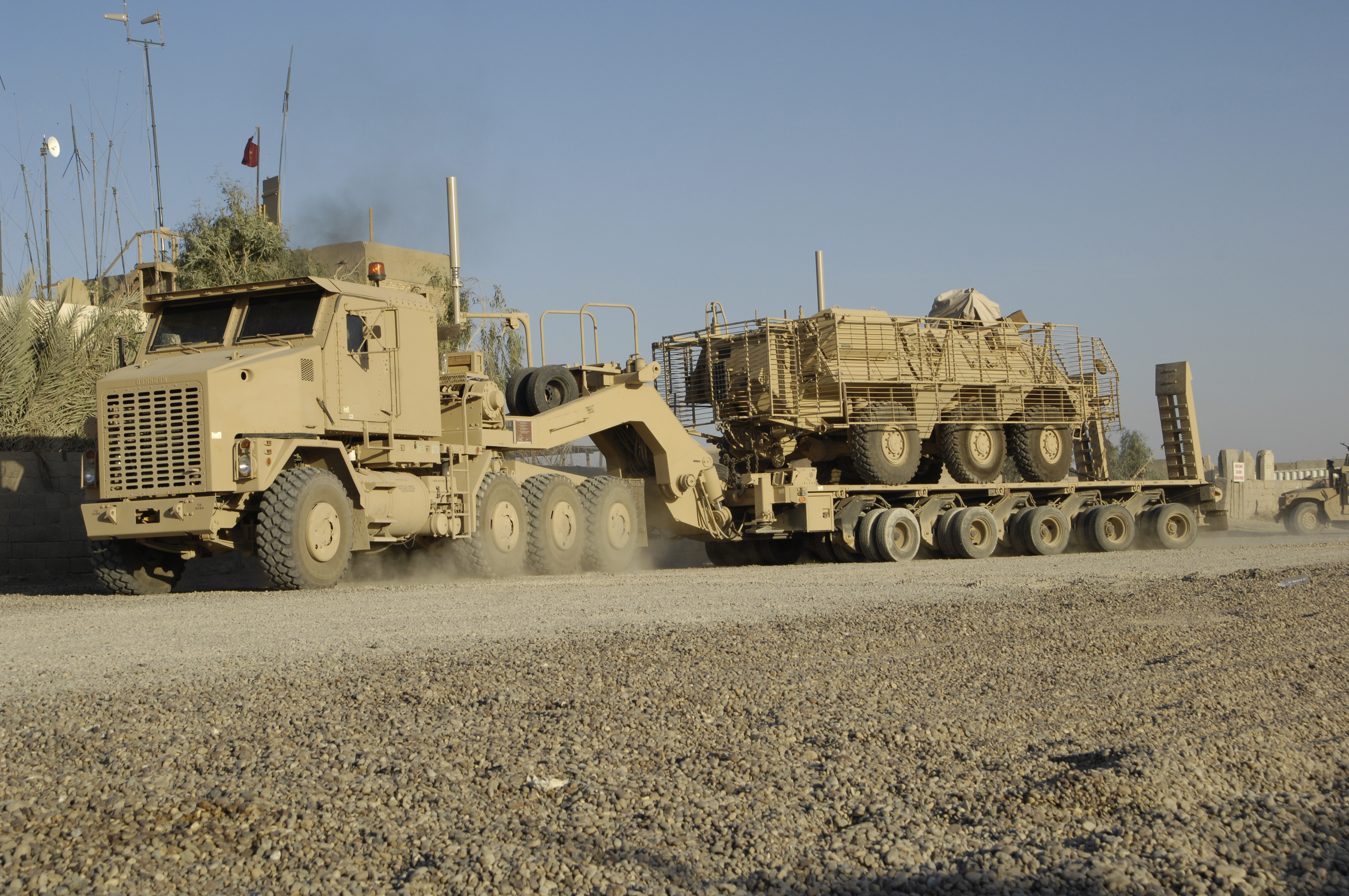
An Oshkosh M1070 8×8 Heavy Equipment Transporter (HET) tractor pulling a 5-bogie M1000 HETS trailer, carrying a slat-armored M93 Fox 6×6 NBC detection vehicle near Baghdad

A tractor unit can have many axles depending on axle load legislation. The most common varieties are those of 4×2, 6×2, and 6×4 types (Note: Total wheels X driven wheels, with 2 wheels per axle regardless of whether single or dual tires.). However, some manufacturers offer 4×4, 6×6, 8x4, 8×6, 8×8, 10×8, and 10×10 axle configurations. A 6×4 has three axles, normally an undriven front steer axle and the two rear axles driven. 6×4 units are more common in long-distance haulage in larger countries such as the United States and Australia. In Europe, the 4×2 and 6×2 variants are more commonplace.

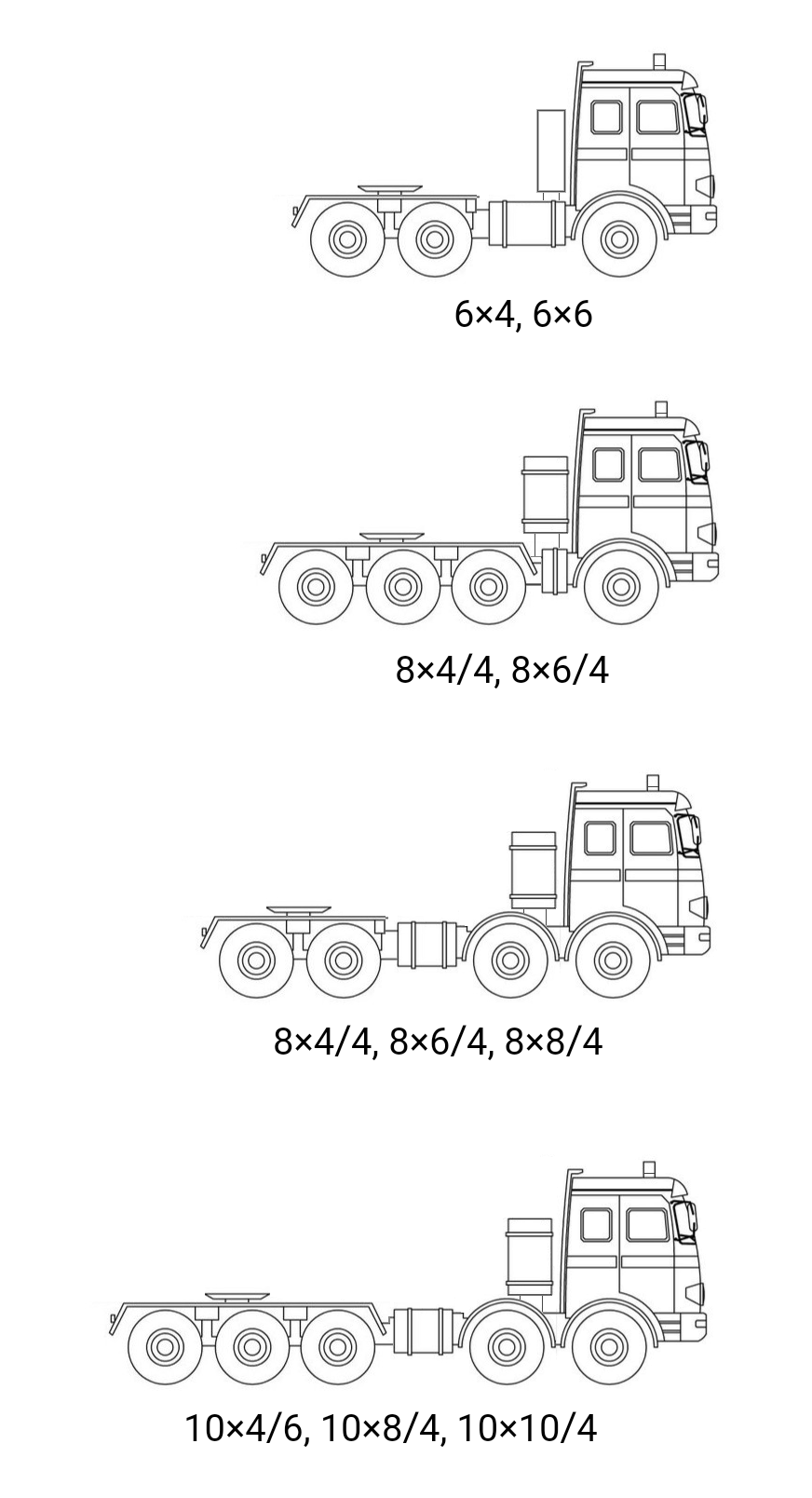
Typical tractor unit versions from heavy haulage, possible ballast tractor

Tractors with three axles or more can have more than one steering axle, which can also be driven. Most 6×2 units allow the undriven rear axle to be raised when lightly loaded, or running without a trailer, to save tire wear, save toll road fees, and increase traction on the driven axle. The 6×6 units have three axles, all can be driven, and 8×6 units have four axles, with either the rear three driven and the front axle not, or the front and rear-most two axles powered and an unpowered lifting center axle to spread the load when needed. The 8×8 units also have four axles, but with all of them driven, and 10×8 units have five axles with the rear four usually driven and the front axle for steering. All five axles of 10×10 units are driven. The front two axles are usually both steer axles. The axle configurations are usually based on axle load legislation, and maximum gross vehicle weight ratings (BDM).

Heavier versions of tractor units, such as those used in heavy haulage and road trains, tend to have four or more axles, with more than two axles driven. In certain countries (such as Switzerland), a certain amount of weight must be spread over driven axles, which led to heavier varieties having six-wheel drive, otherwise, another tractor unit would have to be used. Heavy haulage variants of tractor-units are often turned into a ballast tractor by fitting temporary ballast, which may require special permitting.

== See also ==
- Articulated vehicle
- Artillery tractor
- Ballast tractor
- Cab over
- Gladhand connector
- Road train
- Mechanical Horse
- Semi-trailer truck
- Terminal tractor
- Toter
- Tractor
- Truck sleeper
