= Drawbar (haulage) =

Vehicle and trailer coupling

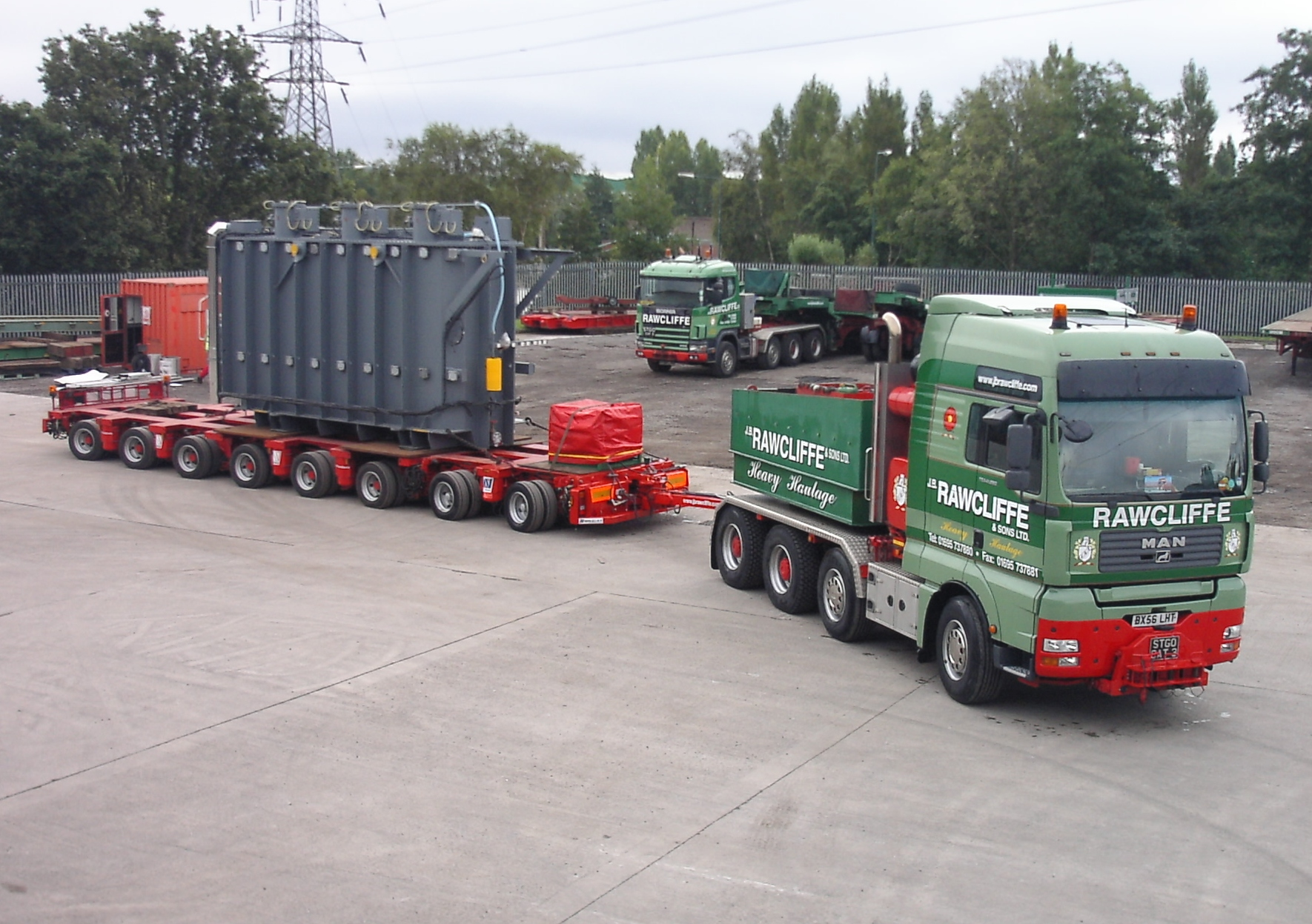
A large ballast tractor pulling a load using a drawbar

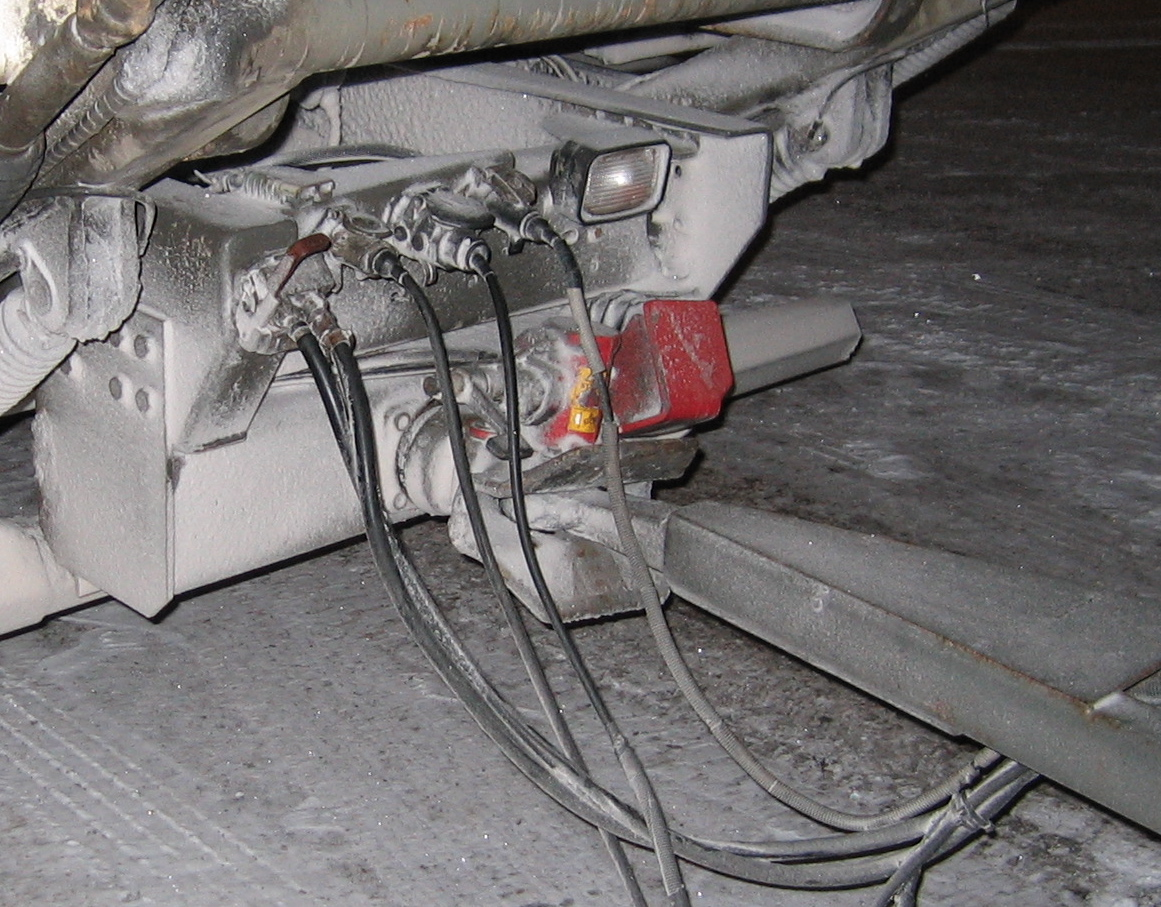
General duty tow hitch from VBG on a truck and a drawbar on a trailer, showing a connected drawbar eye

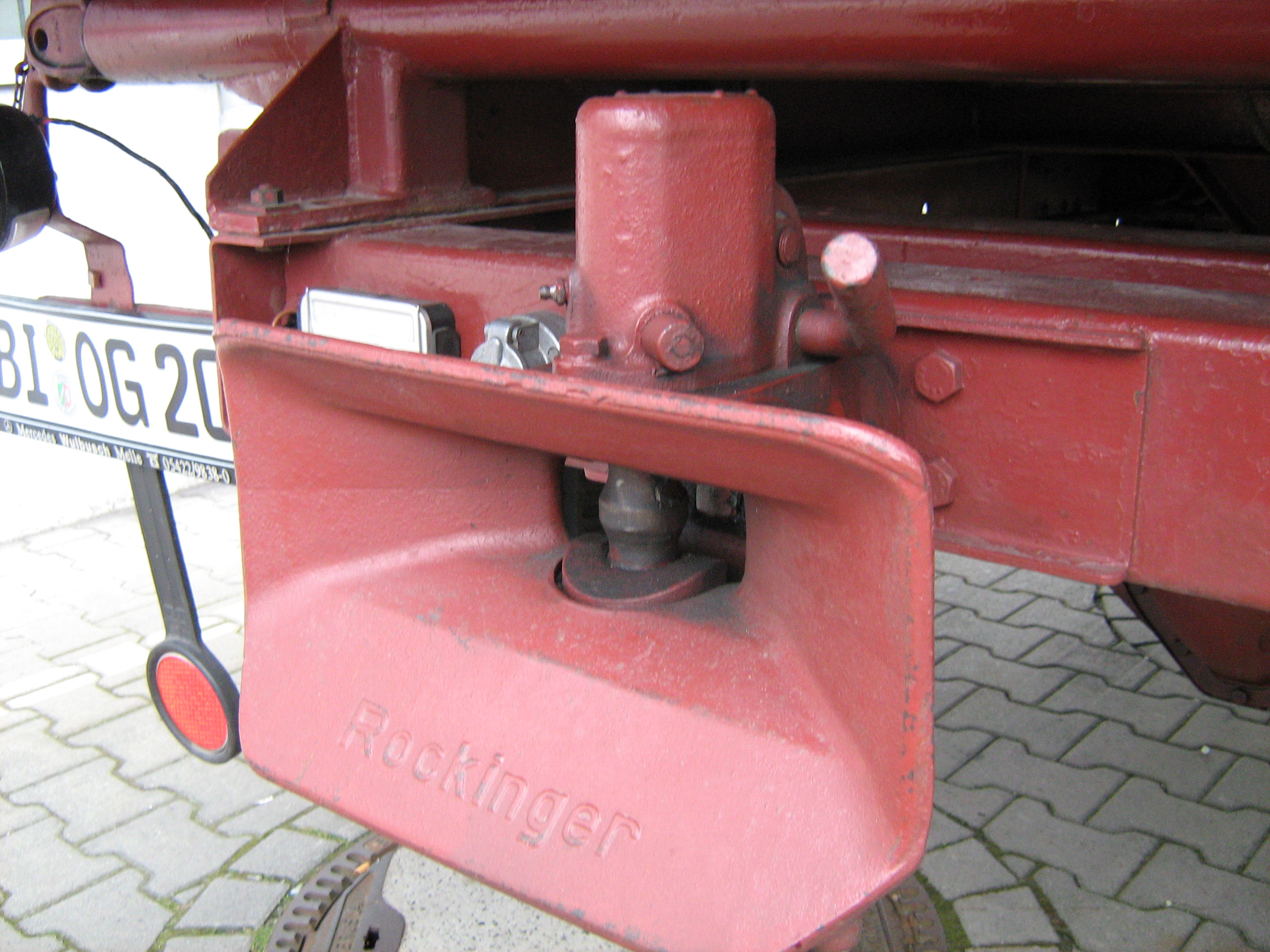
Rockinger drawbar coupling, in which the drawbar eye gets locked

A drawbar is a solid coupling between a hauling vehicle and its hauled load. Drawbars are in common use with rail transport; road trailers, both large and small, industrial and recreational; and agricultural equipment.

== Agriculture and horse-drawn vehicles ==
Agricultural equipment is hauled by a tractor-mounted drawbar. Specialist agricultural tools such as ploughs are attached to specialist drawbars which have functions in addition to transmitting tractive force. This was partly made redundant with Ferguson's development of the three-point linkage in his famous TE20. A wooden drawbar extends from the front of a wagon, cart, chariot or other horse-drawn vehicles to between the horses. A steel drawbar attaches a three-point hitch or other farm implement to a tractor.

== Road ==
A drawbar is a towing or pushing connection between a tractive vehicle and its load.

=== Light vehicles ===
On light vehicles, the most common coupling is an A-frame drawbar coupled to a 1 7/8 inch or 50 mm tow ball. These drawbars transmit around 10% of the gross trailer weight through the coupling.

=== Heavy vehicles ===
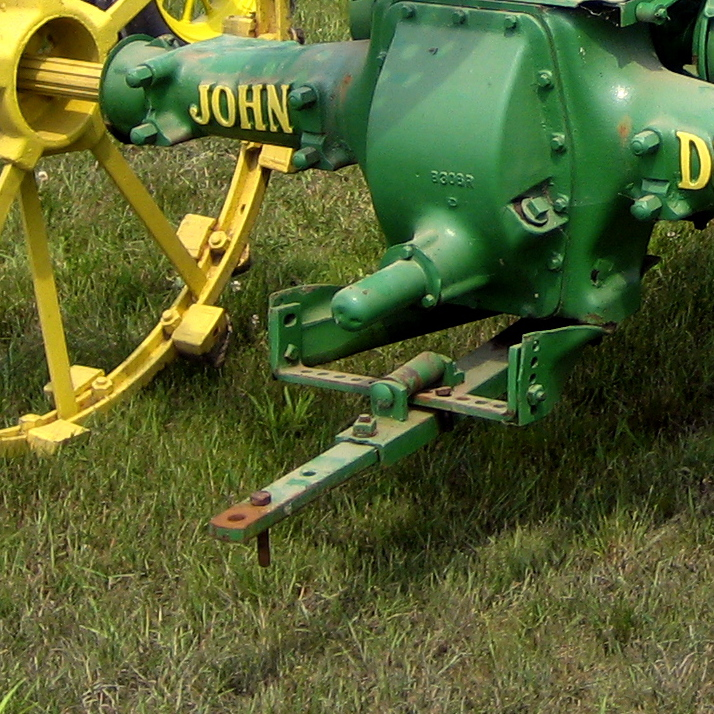
A swinging drawbar on a John Deere GP tractor from circa the 1930s.

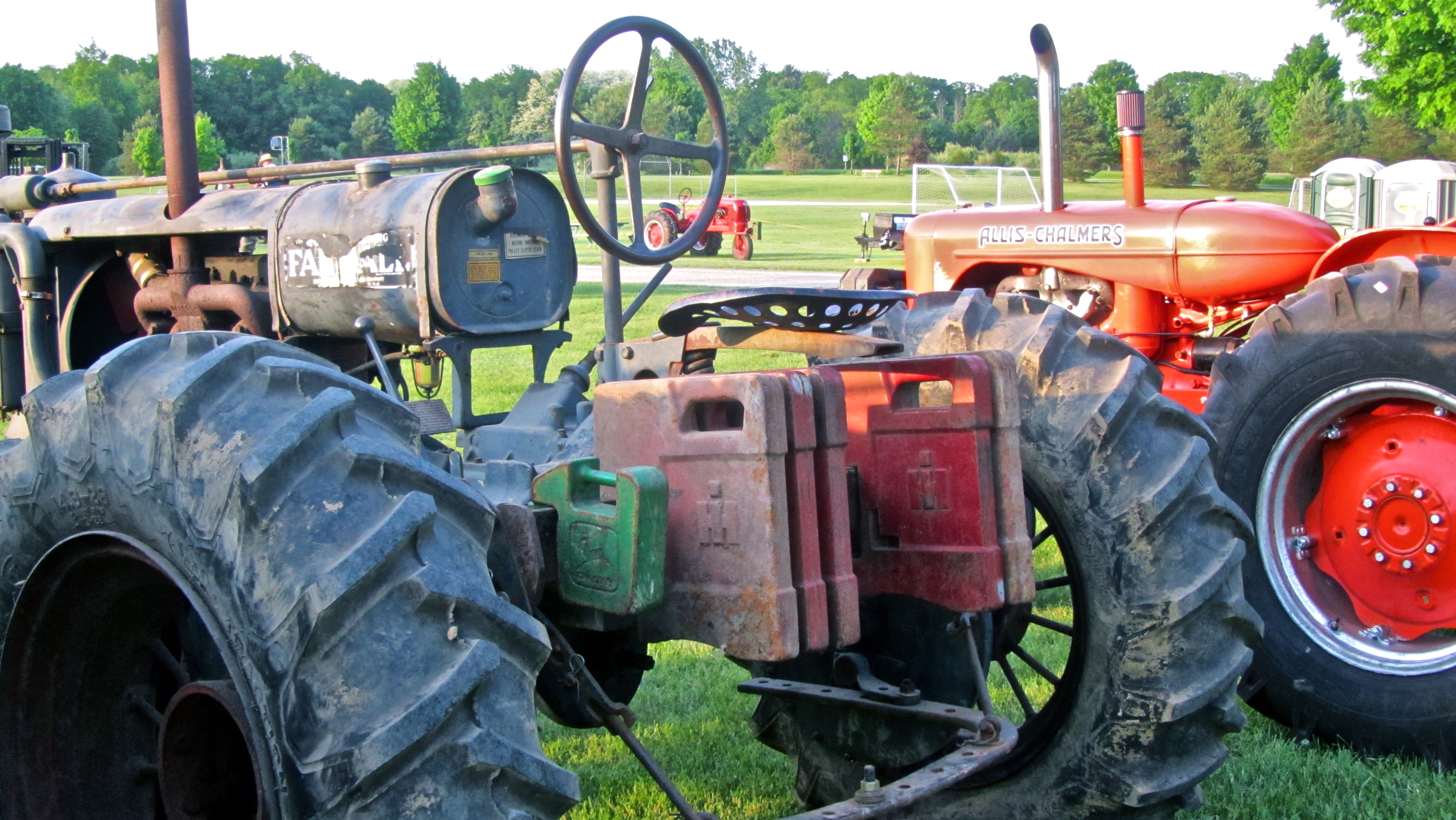
The drawbar is at bottom center in this photo.

The direction of haulage may be push or pull, though pushing tends to be for a pair of ballast tractors working together, one pulling and the other pushing an exceptional load on a specialist trailer. The most common drawbar configuration for heavy vehicles is an A-frame drawbar at the front of a full trailer that connects to a tow coupling on a hauling vehicle

On heavy vehicles, the drawbar is coupled using a drawbar eye, typically of 40 mm or 50 mm diameter, connected to a bolt and pin coupling. Commonly seen brands include Ringfeder, V. Orlandi and Jost Rockinger. These drawbars transmit little or no downwards force through the coupling.

The drawbar should not be confused with the fifth wheel coupling. The drawbar requires a trailer which either loads the drawbar lightly (for example a small boat trailer, or caravan, or the load is the weight of the coupling components only (larger trailers, usually but not always with a steerable hauled axle, front or rear). By contrast, the fifth wheel is designed to transmit a proportion of the load's weight to the hauling vehicle. Drawbar configuration is mostly seen on hydraulic modular trailer and ballast tractor combination to haul oversize loads which require special trailer and tractor.

=== Drawbar eye ===
A drawbar eye, also called tow eye, is a mechanical part to connect an independent trailer/dolly via a drawbar coupling to a tractor. They are made from high tensile material to bear heavy loads while being pulled by the tractor. The eye is made in the shape of an "i" with a hole at top which is locked in the drawbar coupling and the lower part is mounted to the drawbar making it an essential connector between the drawbar and drawbar coupling. The drawbar eye is used in many heavy transport operations around the world. It is mostly used for agriculture equipment, construction equipment, road trains, dolly trailers, full trailer and hydraulic modular trailers.

== Rail ==
Two or more passenger or freight cars may be attached by means of a drawbar rather than a coupler. At each end of the permanently coupled vehicles there is a regular coupler, such as the North American Janney coupler or the Russian SA3 coupler. The use of a drawbar eliminates slack action.

=== Rail applications ===
- MR-90
- MR-63
- MR-73
- MPM-10
- Drawgear

== See also ==
- Ballast tractor
- Drawbar force gauge
- Drawgear
- Fifth Wheel and Gooseneck
- Fifth wheel coupling
- Jumper cable
- Ringfeder
- Three point hitch
- Tow hitch
