= Rig 'n' Roll =

2009 video game

Rig'n'Roll
- North American cover art
- Developer: SoftLab-NSK
- Publishers: 1C Entertainment (Russia & UK); SoftClub (Russia); Rondomedia (Germany); Cenega (Poland & CZE); Focus Multimedia (UK); THQ (North America)
- Designer: Igor Belago
- Platform: Microsoft Windows
- Release: Boxed/retail: RU: November 27, 2009; CZE: May 7, 2010; GER: May 22, 2010; POL: June 11, 2010; UK: June 25, 2010; NA: July 14, 2010; Digital download: RU: November 18, 2009; EN: April 16, 2010; GER: May 20, 2010
- Genre: Truck simulator
- Mode: Single-player

Rig'n'Roll (originally Russian: Дальнобойщики 3: Покорение Америки, lit. 'Hauler 3: Conquest of America') is an open world truck driving simulation and racing video game released on 27 November 2009 in Russia and during 2010 in the rest of the world. It simulates truck driving and management along with associated business strategic activities, and features North American trucks. The game takes place in California and Nevada, in the year 2014.

The game was published by 1C and developed by SoftLab-NSK's Igor Belago, who was inspired by games like Grand Theft Auto. Rig'n'Roll also includes a program for the creation of skins for trucks, license plates, and trailers. Gameplay modes include racing, single-player missions, regular truck driving, and free cruising. It is the third installment of Dalnoboishiki series, which first two installments were exported by SCS Software under Hard Truck brand. Although third game was exported under Rig'n'Roll name by and SCS Software reused naming for Hard Truck: 18 Wheels of Steel game.

== Gameplay ==
Rig'n'Roll offers a lot of road exploration based on real-life locations, with multiple missions to be completed and places to visit in non-linear environments. Management in this game is done by using sliders, and much of the game is focused around cargo/truck selection and choosing routes. To start missions, the player drives into a warehouse and chooses either a normal delivery to another warehouse (which can be a solo delivery or a competition against AI opponents; the highest payment goes to whoever reaches the destination first) or a race with other truck drivers. Every delivery has a time limit, and the payment will be deducted if the player's truck hits anything while delivering fragile goods. While on the roads, players can interact with NPCs (e.g. hitchhikers) and take on sidequests.

For the management part of the game, the player is able to hire or fire drivers, adjust driver AI behavior for both trucks and cargoes, upgrade their fleet of trucks, view rankings list, improve truck rating statistics, manage and expand their business economy at freight management offices, warehouses, and via a PDA device known as "Black Shark". Each driver has their own preferences for options such as choosing to make long or short distance deliveries, whether they should deliver fragile goods and how often they should participate in races. Changing the AI behavior may increase the amount of money the driver earns for the company per day but it may sometimes cause their loyalty to drop.

Although there are no speed limits on any of the in-game roads, there is a heavy emphasis on following traffic laws while driving. In addition to hitting other vehicles, the player can be pulled over and fined by the police for offences like driving at night with the headlights off, driving in the wrong direction and not giving right of way. Committing an offence will usually trigger a pursuit by a police car even if there are none around at the time when the offence took place.

== Development ==
This game was in development for over 9 years due to the developer of the game focusing mainly on making hardware/software equipment for multimedia, TV broadcasting, VR systems, imaging systems for training simulators, and video game engines for computer games.

Before release, it was also featured at E3 2005, Gamescom, as well as several other Russian gaming exhibitions and developer conferences. A demo was announced for 2009 and then for 2010, but both scheduled dates were canceled. All cheats were taken out of the game prior to release. Also, modding possibilities, trainer usage, save file hex-editing and hacking of the game were somewhat restricted.

== Reception ==
Rig'n'Roll has so far received mostly fair to positive (mixed) reviews on the Metacritic/GameRankings sites respectively, praising the game for its realistic graphics in depicting the Californian scenery, impressive physics, truck designs, music soundtrack, intuitive controls, mission structure, and gameplay variety. The game was also criticized because of its truck-driving simulation aspects feeling too "arcadey", for having a weak in-game tutorial, a lack of multiplayer, and for frequent delays in development.
