= Hard Truck Apocalypse =

2005 video game

Hard Truck: Apocalypse
- Developer: Targem Games
- Publishers: EU: Nival Interactive; NA: CDV Software; WW: Buka Entertainment (Steam)
- Series: Hard Truck
- Engine: m3d engine
- Platform: Windows
- Release: EU: December 8, 2005; NA: June 19, 2006
- Genres: Vehicular combat, business simulation, post-apocalyptic science fiction
- Mode: Single-player

Hard Truck: Apocalypse, known in Europe as Ex Machina, is a 2005 vehicular combat video game developed by Russian developer Targem Games. It is part of the Hard Truck series. It is a Privateer-like game based around vehicles instead of spaceships, set in a post-apocalyptic Europe. The player controls an armored truck and roams between settlements trading with locals, completing quests and fighting numerous enemies to upgrade the truck and acquire better weapons to progress through the main storyline.

== Gameplay ==
Gameplay revolves around destroying enemies to get loot, selling it, and getting upgrades for truck or buying new vehicles. The game has four difficulties: Rookie, Experienced, Professional and Master. There are many viable options for weapons, gadgets, vehicle parts, etc. The more the players upgrade own vehicle, the more expensive it gets, causing better and stronger enemies to spawn. Enemies will also damage the player's vehicle, and the players must repair it. There is an alternate storyline for added play-throughs.

There are main quests (marked with orange), and side quests (marked with magenta), which the players can get from NPCs in settlements to earn more cash. There is a trading system in the game, where the player can buy goods from one settlement and sell it to another, or loot enemies to get goods. Different settlements will have different prices for buying and selling.

=== Format ===
The players earn coins by trading, selling loot and performing jobs for NPCs. They can buy various weapons and gadgets, and can buy better vehicles. The players can use these purchases to defend against attacks from raiders.

== Plot ==
Hard Truck Apocalypse is set in post-apocalyptic Europe, in which the main character sets out on a quest to avenge his father who was killed by raiders. The end of the world was brought about by nuclear war, as an effect of the radiation everyone wears masks. Throughout the game the player will choose which factions to oppose and which to support as he seeks to avenge his father's death. The player will travel across European countries in a variety of trucks whom he can upgrade with various parts and performance enhancing devices as well as many types of standard firearm weapons to high tech plasma, energy and explosive weapons.

The game also features several factions some of whom the player will be forced to support or oppose.

- Vagabonds - Raider faction.
- Adventurers - A group of self interest adventurers who seek excitement and treasure.
- Felix's gang - A small gang of raiders who the main character wrongly accused of murdering his father.
- North path traders - A trading faction.
- Technicians - Group of people who highly value any and all technology.
- Explorers - People who explore the post apocalyptic world for lost technology and locations.
- Children of Iron - Are a group of fanatics who worship technology and build their settlements from iron. A complete opposite from the Druids.
- Druids - A faction devoted to the worship of nature.
- Steel Giants - Raider faction.
- Farmer's Union - A union the main character's father was a part of.
- Nomads - Raider faction.
- Free Traders Alliance - A trading faction.
- Brigade - A faction who are centered around their trucks.
- Commonwealth of Independent Towns - The enemy of Crimson dawn with whom they are in war with.
- Crimson Dawn - The Enemy of Commonwealth of Independent Towns led by a charismatic and tyrannical leader.
- Oracle's Disciples- A faction that serves the oracle.

== Reception ==
Reception

Aggregate score
| Aggregator | Score |
|---|---|
| Metacritic | 45/100 |

Review scores
| Publication | Score |
|---|---|
| Computer Games Magazine | 2.5/5 |
| Eurogamer | 4/10 |
| GameSpot | 4.4/10 |
| GameStar | 60% |
| GameZone | 4.5/10 |
| IGN | 4/10 |
| PC Gamer (US) | 54% |
| X-Play | 2/5 |
| The A.V. Club | C− |

The game received "generally unfavorable reviews" according to the review aggregation website Metacritic, receiving an average of 45 out of 100 over 11 critical reviews.

== Add-ons ==
=== Hard Truck Apocalypse: Rise of the Clans (Ex Machina: meridian 113) ===
Rise of the Clans is the official standalone expansion to Hard Truck Apocalypse, also developed by Targem Games. It takes place in a post-apocalyptic version of North America. The player controls a vagrant who is searching for the mythical city of Edmonton.

The game reuses a lot of material from Hard Truck Apocalypse; most of the vehicles, weapons, and enemies are the same, but there are four brand new zones and a whole new storyline.

== Crossout ==
The universe of Hard Truck Apocalypse expanded with its spiritual heir, post-apocalyptic free-to-play MMO-action game Crossout, also developed by Targem Games in cooperation with Gaijin Entertainment.

Crossout is set in 2047 after a mysterious viral epidemic known as the 'Crossout' which has laid waste to most of the population on Earth. The road warriors that survived must now battle for precious resources using deadly vehicles crafted from millions of possible permutations (body shape, armor, weapons, support systems and cosmetic enhancements).

Crossout is available on PC via Steam, PlayStation 4 and Xbox One.
