= STAA doubles =

United States long combination vehicle

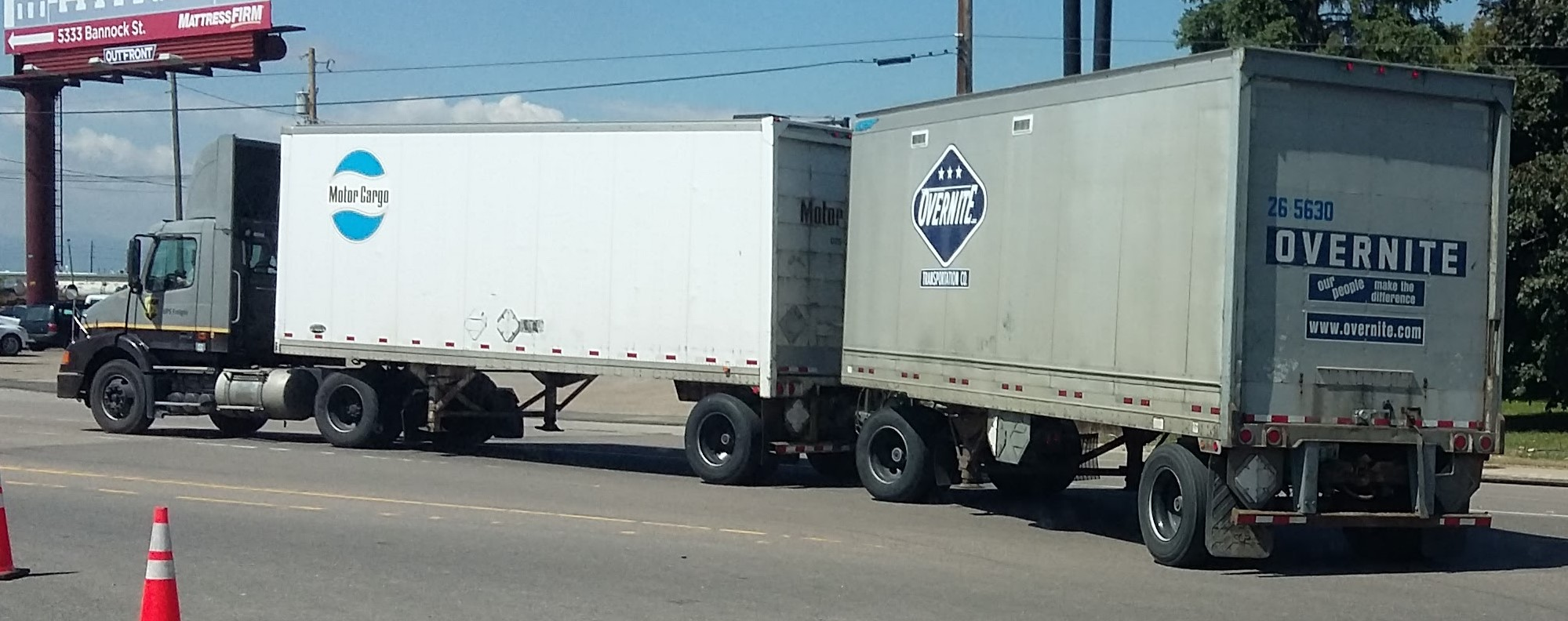
STAA double pup 28.5 foot trailers

STAA doubles or double pups are a type of long combination vehicle in the United States. They are named for the Surface Transportation Assistance Act (STAA) of 1982. Each trailer is 28.5 feet (8.7 meters) long and 8.5 feet (2.6 meters) wide. The doubles are connected via a dolly. This long combination vehicle is the only combination of trailers allowed nationwide in the United States. The axle weight allowed is 20,000 pounds (9,100 kg) per single axle. STAA doubles make up less than 3% of the freight trailer fleet in the United States.

== See also ==
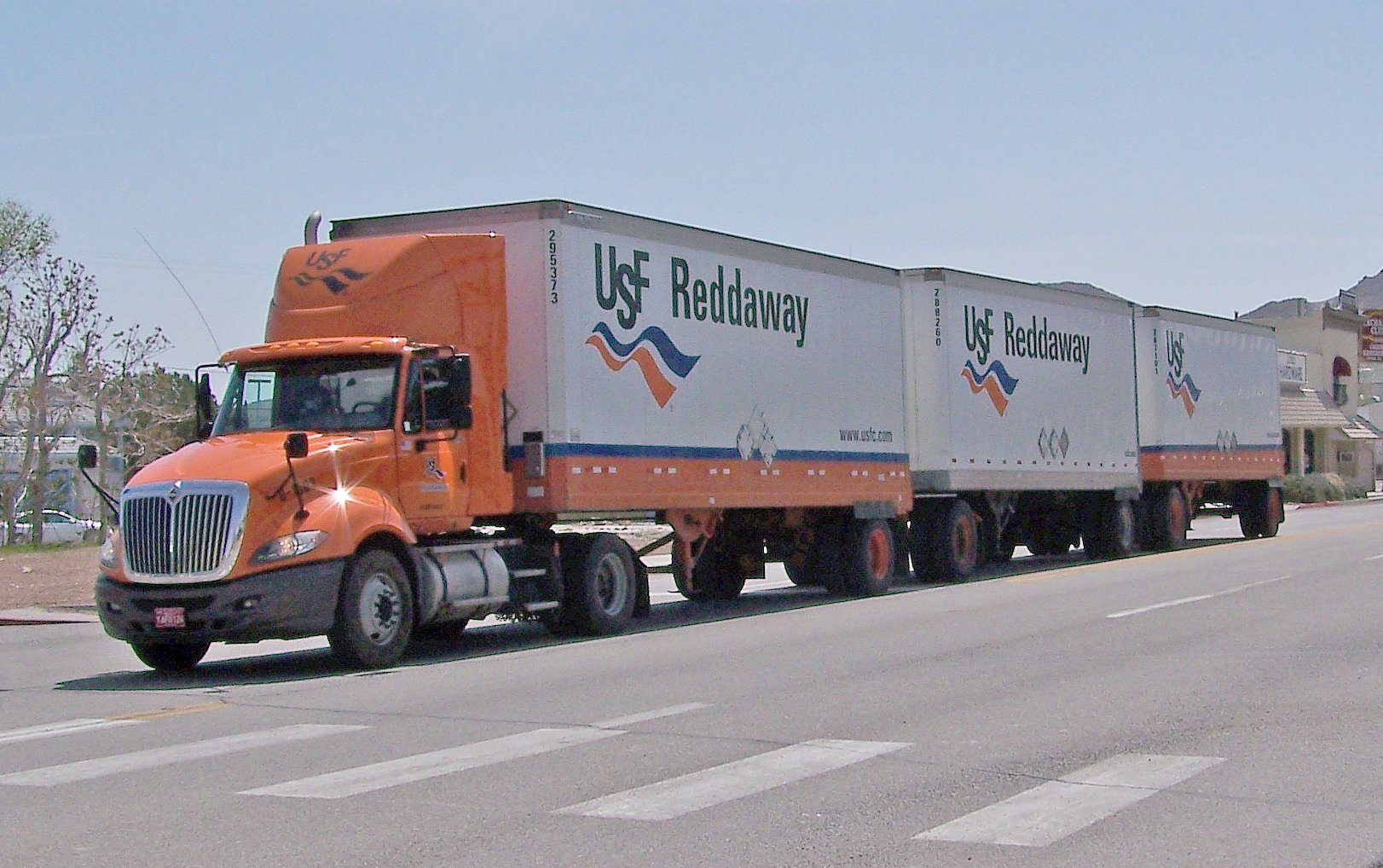
Triple trailers

- Federal Bridge Gross Weight Formula
- Road train
