= Hard Truck =

Video game series

- Genres: Simulation games, racing video games
- Publisher: ValuSoft
- First release: Hard Truck; April 20, 1998
- Latest release: Hard Truck: 18 Wheels of Steel; August 15, 2002
- Spin-offs: Hard Truck Apocalypse; 18 Wheels of Steel

Hard Truck is a series of trucking simulators and racing video games published in the United States by ValuSoft. The series consists of three main titles and a spin-off.

== Games ==
=== Main series ===
==== Hard Truck ====
The original Hard Truck

The original Hard Truck, also subtitled as Hard Truck: Road to Victory, was developed by Russian developer SoftLab-NSK published by Buka Entertainment, and released on April 20, 1998. It emphasized truck racing, in which players can race against trucks without cargo on a 3-lap circuit or with cargo to deliver on any of 3 linear courses, with no other vehicles present. All racing courses, including a training course, are accessible from a central base of operations where the player can obtain cargo, as well as purchase upgrades or even new trucks.

This game featured the following trucks: DAF, ZiL, GAZelle, MAZ T-Storm, Mack Vision, Kenworth, Peterbilt, Freightliner Trucks Century Classic, Navistar (International Trucks), and Renault Magnum.

==== Hard Truck 2 ====
Hard Truck 2: King of the Road is a 2000 sequel to Hard Truck. Like its predecessor, it is open world, but grants far more freedom with a larger world that only requires one loading screen per play session, while shifting focus from racing to cargo transport across various cities (although competition with rival truckers is still present). It also adds traffic, police and the Russian mafia, and trucks can fall under attack if drivers do not practice safe driving or are spotted by the Russian mafia. Making money with successful deliveries is crucial to the overall gameplay of the game itself, as running out of funds would result in a game over, and the ultimate goal of the game is to achieve dominance of the trucking market (with at least a 51% stake), but not before gaining enough money to start a company first.

The sequel incorporates the same truck brands from the first game, while also including Volvo, Scania AB and Mercedes-Benz Actros. Cars that can be encountered in gameplay include the BMW M5, the Renault Megane, the Fiat Marea, the Offroad HL/PS, the Oka and the Volga.

==== Hard Truck: 18 Wheels of Steel ====
In 2002, a third Hard Truck game developed by SCS Software was also released, subtitled 18 Wheels of Steel. Unlike the previous two Hard Truck games, it removes racing altogether and focuses entirely on delivery of goods, playing more similar to Hard Truck 2. It also incorporates a traffic system, as well as elements of business management simulation, where drivers can be hired and routes set up to make a profit.

This is also the first game of ValuSoft's 18 Wheels of Steel series, consisting of several games and spanning nearly a decade.

=== Spin-offs ===
==== Hard Truck Apocalypse ====
Hard Truck Apocalypse, released on June 26, 2006, is another spin-off of Hard Truck, but its connection to the themes of Hard Truck is remotely in name only. Developed by the Russian developer Targem Games, Apocalypse is a completely different take on the Hard Truck games, set in an apocalyptic, Mad Max-like future. A disaster occurred and everyone on Earth has to wear special masks to survive. Trade runs between villages to make money can still be done but the main method for making money is to loot destroyed enemies of cargo and weapons.

The game takes place in an apocalyptic version of Europe, with different zones depicting countries like Germany, France, England, and many more. Five vehicles, from a simple van to the gigantic BelAZ, are available to drive. The guns vary from roof-mounted machine guns, shotguns, and mortars to laser and energy weapons.

The game was soon followed by Hard Truck Apocalypse: Rise of Clans (original Russian title "Ex Machina: Меридиан 113"), the official standalone expansion to Hard Truck Apocalypse, also developed by Targem Games. It takes place in an apocalyptic version of North America. In the game the player is a vagrant, a strong loner who is searching for the mythical city of Edmonton in Canada.

The game reuses a lot of material from Hard Truck Apocalypse, but most of the vehicles, weapons, and enemies are the same. There are four new zones and a whole new storyline.

== Reception ==
In the United States, the Hard Truck series sold 790,000 copies between January 2000 and August 2006.

== See also ==
- Rig 'n' Roll
- 18 Wheels of Steel
