= 18 Wheels of Steel =

Truck-simulation video game series

18 Wheels of Steel is a series of trucking simulators developed by SCS Software and published by ValuSoft from 2002 to 2011, as a spin-off of Hard Truck, with the first game becoming the third Hard Truck game released.

== Games ==
Release timeline
2002	Hard Truck: 18 Wheels of Steel
2003	18 Wheels of Steel: Across America
2004	18 Wheels of Steel: Pedal to the Metal
2005	18 Wheels of Steel: Convoy
2006	18 Wheels of Steel: Haulin'
2007	18 Wheels of Steel: American Long Haul
2008
2009	18 Wheels of Steel: Extreme Trucker
2010
2011	18 Wheels of Steel: Extreme Trucker 2

=== Hard Truck: 18 Wheels of Steel [15 Aug 2002] ===
The first installment in the series, released in 2002.

=== 18 Wheels of Steel: Across America [23 Sep 2003] ===
This installment is similar to Hard Truck: 18 Wheels of Steel except that the graphics were updated, more trucks and cargo were added, and a new map was created that enables users to travel across the entire continental U.S., through 30 cities. In this version, players can choose from 30 trucks and 40+ trailers. Time is made up of a total of 24 minutes in a day in the clock. This game focuses on the delivery of cargo. Players also go against three AI drivers. Unlike its predecessor, Across America does not feature a sleep timer. There is an improved traffic model as well as airplanes, helicopters, and trains with authentic sounds.

=== 18 Wheels of Steel: Pedal to the Metal [30 Aug 2004] ===
In this installment, released in 2004, the user can travel across the entire continental US, and also through northern Mexico and southern Canada, through 30 cities. The sleep timer was brought back in this version. It has an improved traffic model. 18 Wheels of Steel: Pedal to the Metal requires OpenGL. It also has the fastest map to date besides Haulin' and is the first trucking game to feature more than one country.

=== 18 Wheels of Steel: Convoy [1 Sep 2005] ===
In this updated installment, the player can travel through the United States, as well as southern Canada, though it differs from Pedal to the Metal in that Mexican cities are not present. The player can travel through 30+ cities and choose from 35+ rigs, 45+ cargoes and 47+ trailers. The player has to use the mouse to look outside of the cab at the mirrors. The graphics are also much improved in this version, and users can see drivers in other vehicles and when the trucks are "lugged" under 1500 RPM, they emit black exhaust much like older non-computerized trucks do. Other graphical features such as dynamic dashboard gauges were replaced with simple inanimate textures, although this and minor bugs were fixed with a patch released by SCS Software in 2008. Players can also buy things to protect themselves.

=== 18 Wheels of Steel: Haulin' [8 Dec 2006] ===
This installment adds more cities and has more realistic graphics, but Mexico is gone from this installment, as in Convoy. The ability to use custom soundtracks and save games during deliveries was also added. Users can choose from 32 rigs, 45+ cargoes and 47+ trailers in the game, including double trailers. The game does not require a powerful computer to operate properly since it can run on most older PCs. The game's engine, Prism3d, may not respond on older graphic cards resulting in a game crash on the game's start-up. Countries include the United States and Canada.

=== 18 Wheels of Steel: American Long Haul [3 Dec 2007] ===
This installment of the game is similar to and has the same gameplay as Haulin' but features newly renamed companies, 2 new trucks, and 3 cities in Mexico added. The previous 9 cities (Chihuahua, Guaymas, Monterrey, etc.) from 18 Wheels of Steel: Pedal to the Metal have returned but the map for each was slightly updated.

=== 18 Wheels of Steel: Extreme Trucker [23 Sep 2009] ===
Extreme Trucker lets the player deliver cargoes in any of the three main areas of the game: Yungas Road (also known as Road of Death), Tuktoyaktuk Winter Road, and the Australian Outback. This game is quite different from the previous installments as the whole concept was changed. The player can no longer drive around in free roam unless they decide to go around the map during a delivery, but they can only pick a job offer from the selection menu if users have met its requirements of having multiple new trucks and accomplished deliveries. The trucks and cars are modeled after real brands, although users can not own any vehicles through the game and are simply truck drivers seeking various jobs. Still, today's low to mediocre range computer will be able to run the game without getting low FPS. The game was mostly poorly received by critics. Game was criticised mostly for change of series concept, but was well received by players and some reviews were positive towards the game and praised the game for its graphics and gameplay.

=== 18 Wheels of Steel: Extreme Trucker 2 [6 Jan 2011] ===
Released in 2011, Extreme Trucker 2 is a sequel to 18 Wheels of Steel: Extreme Trucker. The game has two additional locations: Montana and Bangladesh, and a few new types of cargo.

== Sales ==
The series sold in excess of 580,000 units by 2003.
