= Hard Truck: 18 Wheels of Steel =

2002 video game

- Developer: SCS Software
- Publisher: ValuSoft
- Series: Hard Truck; 18 Wheels of Steel
- Platform: Microsoft Windows
- Release: NA: August 16, 2002
- Genre: Simulation game
- Mode: Single-player

Hard Truck: 18 Wheels of Steel is a truck simulation video game developed by SCS Software and published by ValuSoft. It is the first entry in the 18 Wheels of Steel series and also a part of Hard Truck series.

== Gameplay ==
Hard Truck: 18 Wheels of Steel puts players into a role of a truck driver, with some money for the initial expenses. There are three locations to be chosen from at the start, each with their own cities and warehouses. Starting out in a certain city, there are several offers waiting, each with specific information: the driver's experience requirement, the goods' type and its fragility, the final location, the money reward along with the expected delivery deadline. Any order may have additional requirements such as perfect condition (bigger damage, less earnings), goods that outweigh the allowed number (forcing the driver to avoid weight checks), or dangerous goods (that requires a special certificate). If the player decides not to accept the order, after some time the trailer containing the material will disappear, but by approaching it and adding the goods to the truck, it must be delivered, even if unprofitable at the end.

The goal is to transport things from town to town while trying to fulfill the accepted conditions. If the player manages to do so, the company recognition in the form of prestige will increase along with the money gain. If the task is failed, the player will be charged with fines that may exceed the value of the carry itself.

The game offers multiple viewing perspectives. In the first-person view, the player is able to see everything ahead with the mouse being used to tilt around. Meanwhile, the aerial look allows monitoring everything that is nearby, with a 360 degrees rotation around the truck.

== Reception ==
Reception

Review scores
Publication	Score
GameSpot	7.2/10
Gry Online	7/10
Igromania	3.5/5
