= White-Ruxtall 922 =

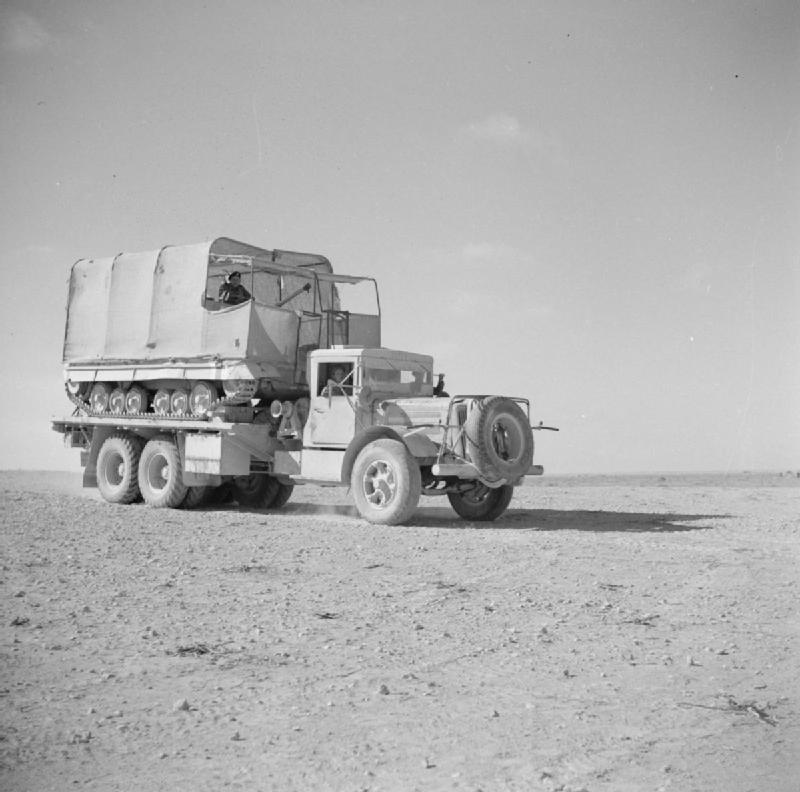
Carrying a Valentine tank in Libya in May 1942.

The White-Ruxtall 922 was a tank transporter produced in 1940 in the United States by the White Motor Company and used by the British Army during World War II.

The French Army tested a prototype in May 1940 and ordered 300 White-Ruxtall tank transporters on June 1. The Fall of France prevented the delivery of any but the order was taken over by the British. By 1940–1941, 250 White-Ruxtalls were in British service.
