= Richard Annesley West =

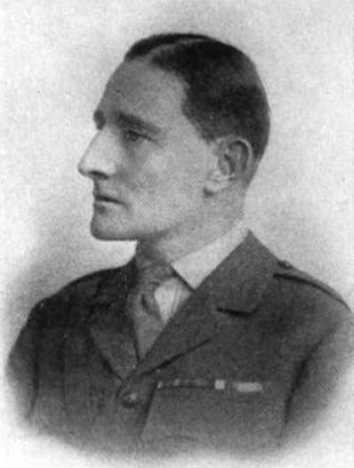
- Born: 26 September 1878; Cheltenham, Gloucestershire, England
- Died: 2 September 1918 (aged 39); Vaulx-Vraucourt, France
- Burial place: Morey Abbey Military Cemetery, Mory
- Military career
- Allegiance: United Kingdom
- Branch: British Army
- Rank: Lieutenant Colonel
- Units: Imperial Yeomanry; North Irish Horse
- Commands: 6th Battalion, Tank Corps
- Conflicts: Second Boer War; First World War
- Awards: Victoria Cross; Distinguished Service Order & Bar; Military Cross; Mentioned in Despatches (2)

Richard Annesley West, VC, DSO & Bar, MC (26 September 1878 – 2 September 1918) was a British Army officer and an English recipient of the Victoria Cross, the highest award for gallantry in the face of the enemy that can be awarded to British and Commonwealth forces.

== Early life and education ==
Richard Annesley West was born on 26 September 1878 at 1 Oxford Street, Cheltenham, the sixth child of Irish landowner and former army officer Augustus George West and his wife Sara West (née Eyre), of Whitepark, County Fermanagh.

He was educated at Monkton Combe School in Somerset and at Uckfield Agricultural College in Sussex.

== Military career ==
West enlisted in the Imperial Yeomanry in 1900 to serve in South Africa, transferring to Kitchener's Fighting Scouts and spending time as a prisoner of war in Linley, Orange Free State. After the war, he remained in South Africa until 1909, farming and training racehorses.

West was 39 years old, and an acting lieutenant colonel in the North Irish Horse, seconded to 6th Battalion, Tank Corps during the First World War when the following action took place for which he was awarded the Victoria Cross.

On 21 August 1918 at Courcelles, France, during an attack, the infantry lost their bearings in dense fog and Lieutenant Colonel West at once collected any men he could find and led them to their objective, in face of heavy machine-gun fire. On 2 September at Vaulx-Vraucourt, he arrived at the front line when the enemy were delivering a local counter-attack. The infantry battalion had suffered heavy officer casualties and realizing the danger if they gave way, and despite the enemy being almost upon them, Colonel West rode up and down in face of certain death, encouraging the men. He fell riddled with bullets. His magnificent bravery at a critical moment so inspired the infantry that the hostile attack was defeated.

He is buried at the Mory Abbey Military Cemetery, Mory.

== The medal ==
His Victoria Cross was purchased on behalf of the Lord Ashcroft collection in 2002 and is displayed on rotation at The Lord Ashcroft Gallery: Extraordinary Heroes exhibition, Imperial War Museum, London.
