= Jelcz 800 =

Series of military trucks

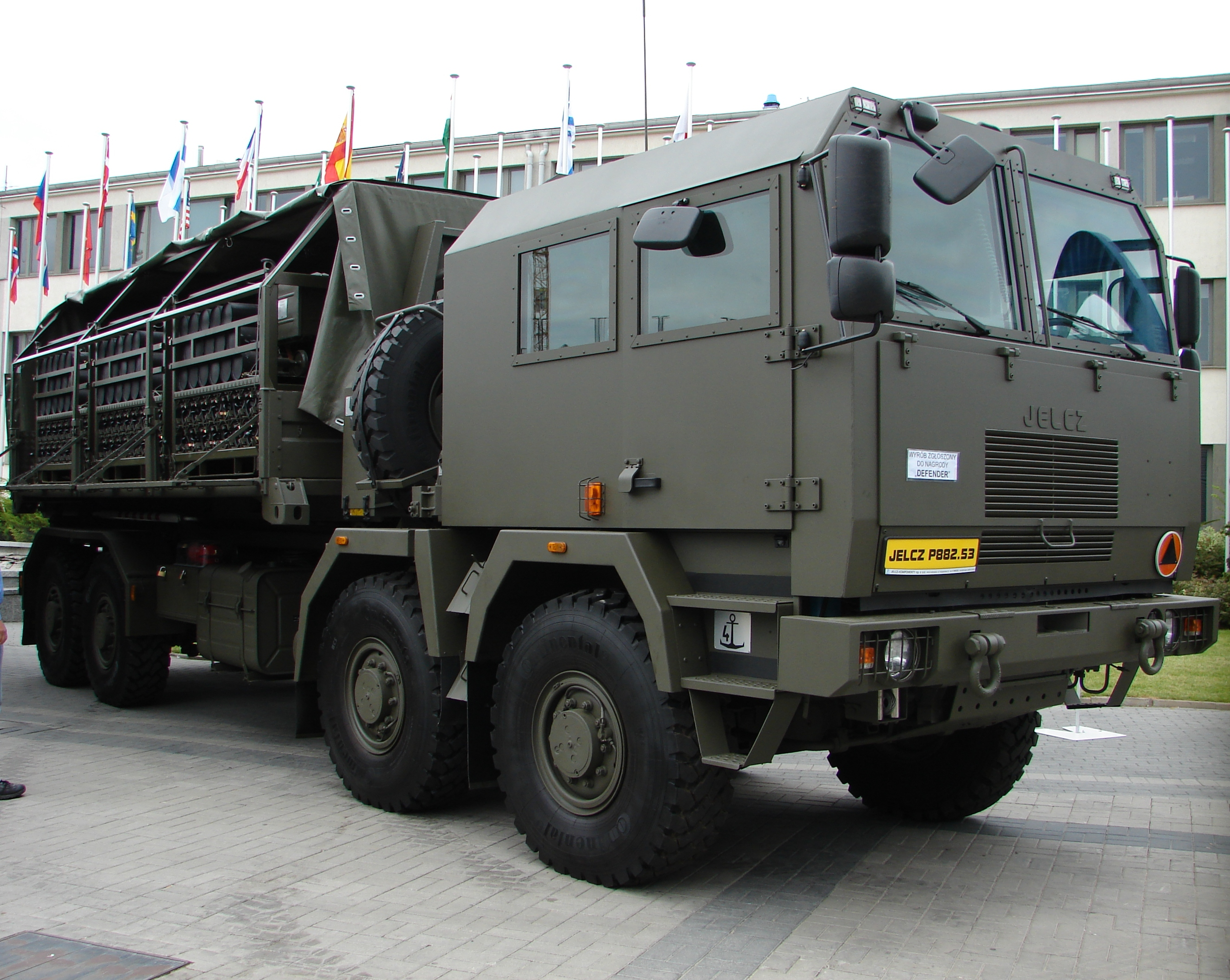
Jelcz P882D53 – ammunition wagon for AHS Krab

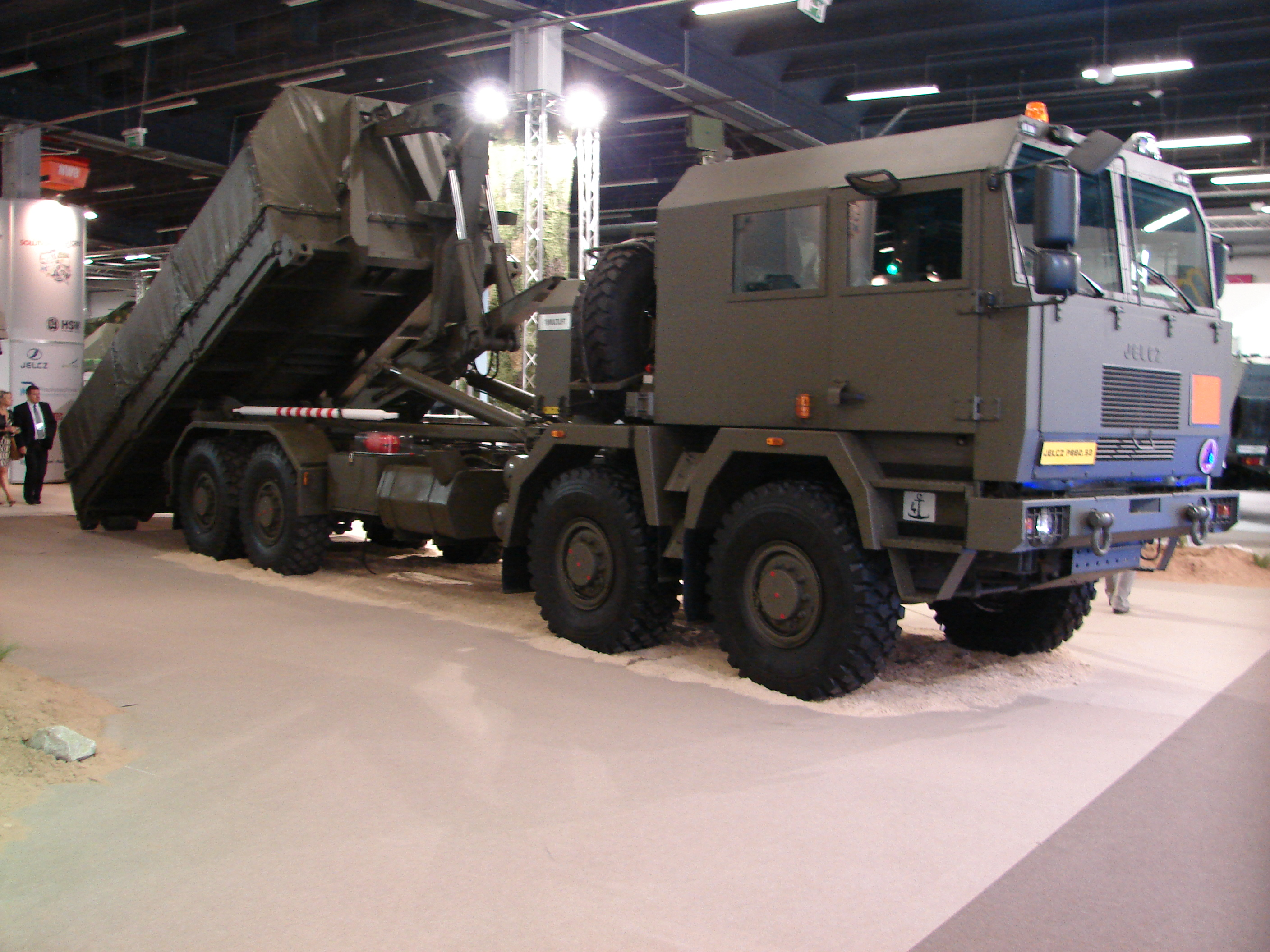
Jelcz P882D53 with Multilift system

Jelcz 800 – A series of trucks intended for military use with increased or high off-road mobility, built in a four-axle configuration, manufactured by Jelcz, equipped with 2-, 4- and 6-person cabins adapted for the installation of additional armor or integrally armored in a standard or reduced-height version.

== Jelcz 882 (8×8) ==
=== Jelcz P882 D.43 / P882 D.53 ===
Four-axle truck chassis manufactured since 2010 with all-wheel drive (8×8 running gear) with high off-road mobility (with single tires for all axles), designed for ADR transport, intended for specialist superstructures, including crane superstructures and self-loading systems. Maximum total weight 32 t (technical 35 t). Net weight of the chassis 13–16.5 t depending on the version, length 11.845 m (PIT TRS-15M radar chassis), width 2.55 m and height 3.305 m.

The drive is a turbodiesel Iveco Cursor 10 EURO III with 430 HP, 1900 Nm at 1050–1590 rpm (Jelcz P882 D.43) or Iveco Cursor 13 with 540 HP / 397 kW. (Jelcz P882 D.53), mechanical 16-speed gearboxes. Optional equipment includes a central tire inflation system (CTIS), a filter-ventilation device, and a winch. Armored cabin with ballistic protection at level 1 (according to STANAG 4569)

In 2010, the Polish Army purchased the first two P882D.43 vehicles with the TRS-15C Odra-C radar station for the Coastal Missile Squadron. The P882D.53 version with a hook-type self-loading system was selected as the ammunition vehicle for the Regina program – Krab self-propelled guns. In 2019, the army signed a contract for the delivery of 24 Artillery Ammunition Vehicles on the P882 D.53 chassis for Rak self-propelled mortars (3 per company fire module). In 2018, the BAOBAB-K Scattered Mine Laying Vehicle was built at HSW on the P882 D.53 chassis.

=== Jelcz P882.57 ===
A further development of the second-generation 8×8 chassis was the P882.52 chassis, developed for the Wisła anti-aircraft missile program. The P882.57 T45 chassis became the chassis for the Homar-K missile launcher (90 units ordered in 2023). In the P882.57 T21 TS version, the DOW became the chassis for the short-range CAMM anti-aircraft missile launcher of the "Mała Narew" program, of which 138 were ordered with deliveries starting in 2027. The P882.57 chassis with a two-seater cabin is also to be the base for the iLauncher38 launcher of the Pilica+ anti-aircraft missile and artillery system (38 chassis were ordered in 2023).

=== Jelcz C882.62 ===
8×8 tractor unit for heavy tank transport units, with a low-bed trailer.

== Jelcz P862 D.43 (8×6) ==
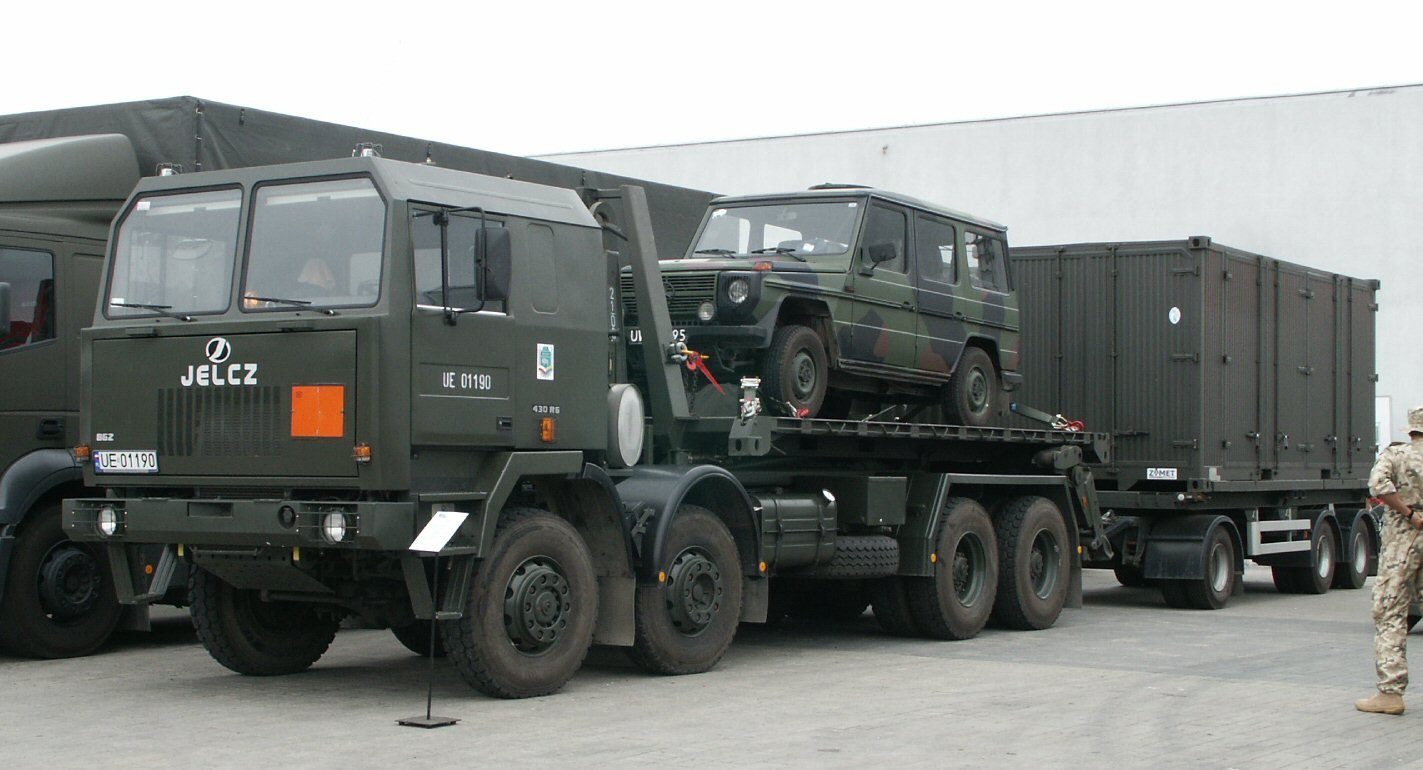
Jelcz P862 D.43 Multilift

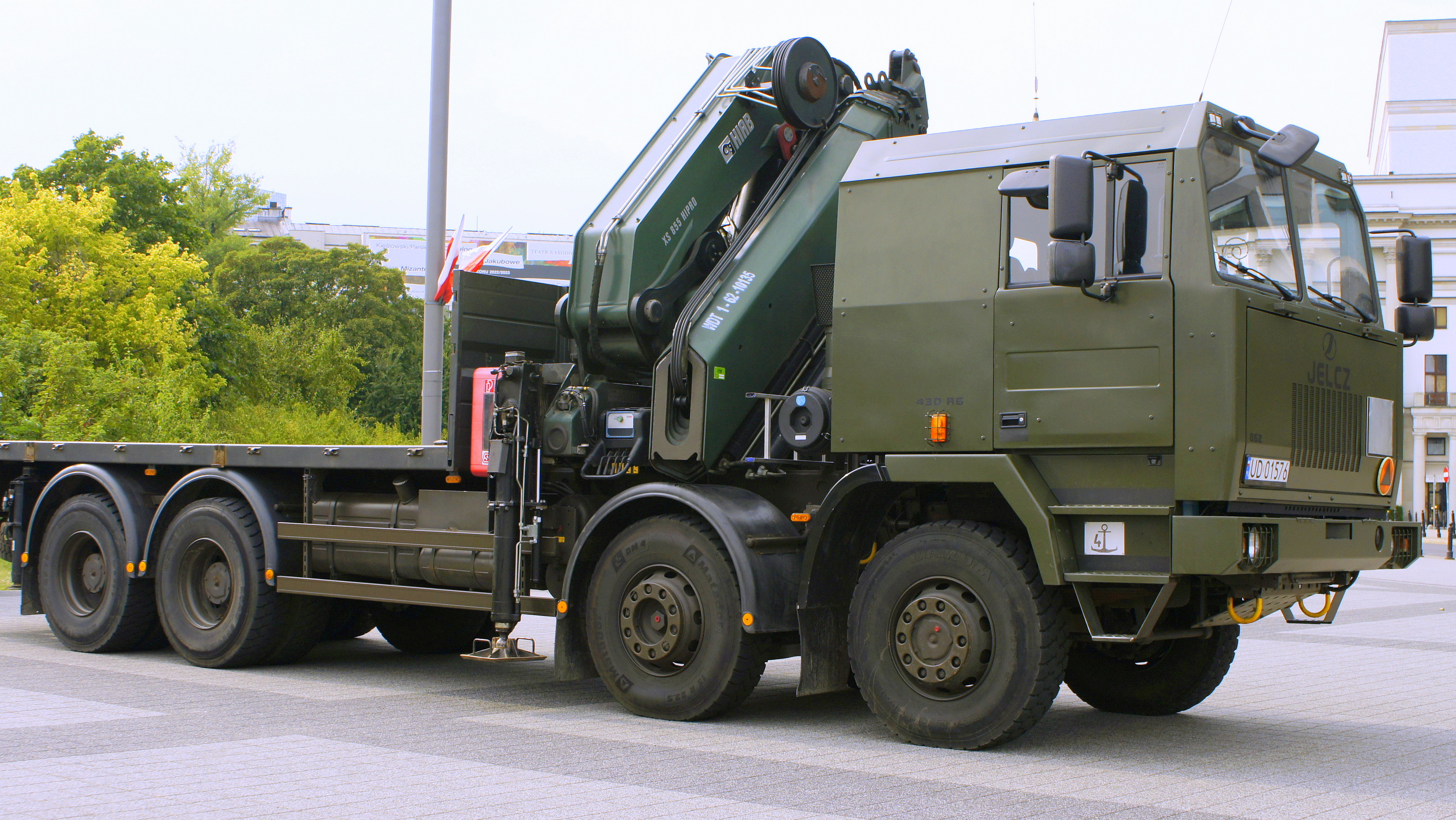
Jelcz 862 with HIAB crane

Truck chassis (version with a cargo box marked S862 D.43) four-axle with drive on three of the four axles (8×6 running gear) with increased off-road mobility (with twin rear axle tires), in ADR execution, intended for specialist superstructures, including crane superstructures and self-loading systems. Maximum total weight 30.05 t. Tare weight of the chassis 12.3-14 t depending on the version, length 9.335 - 11.500 m, width 2.55 m and height 3.305 m.

The drive is an Iveco Cursor 10 engine with 430 HP, 1900 Nm at 1050–1590 rpm (Jelcz P882 D.43), mechanical 16-speed gearboxes. High cabin, adapted for mounting additional armor. By 2011, the Polish Armed Forces had purchased 61 units.

The vehicle was presented and put into production in 2001. From then on, it was one of the most popular heavy logistic transporters of the Polish Armed Forces. In 2014, 12 P862 D.43 vehicles with the Multilift Mk IV loading system were handed over to the Eurocorps.

== Jelcz P842 D.43 (8×4) ==
Truck chassis (version with a cargo box marked S842 D.43) four-axle with drive on two of the four axles (8×4 running gear), road, in ADR execution, intended for specialist superstructures, including crane superstructures and self-loading systems. Maximum total weight 30.05 t (technical 38 t). Tare weight of the chassis 12.3-13 t depending on the version, length 9.335 - 11.500 m, width 2.55 m and height 3.305 m.

The drive is an Iveco Cursor 10 engine with 430 HP, 1900 Nm at 1050–1590 rpm (Jelcz P842 D.43), in older versions also Steyr engines (MAN), mechanical 16-speed gearboxes. High cabin, regular or adapted for mounting additional armor.

== Jelcz P883.57 (8×8) ==
In the autumn of 2023, a prototype of the third-generation 8×8 chassis was presented, in the P883.57 T80 TS version for transporting containers. It is characterized by a lowered forward car cabin and the engine placed behind the cabin. The chassis was also redesigned, introducing independent axle suspension with coil springs. The prototype uses an MTU 6R1500V40 engine with 578 HP and a maximum torque of 2800 Nm. They were planned to be used primarily in the 883.57 T85 version as a chassis for the Homark-K launcher.

== Bibliography ==
- Nowa Technika Wojskowa nr 4/2009 "Zakupy pojazdów użytkowych klasy średniej przez siły zbrojne RP w roku 2008"
- Nowa Technika Wojskowa nr 5/2008 "Zakupy pojazdów użytkowych klas średniej i ciężkiej przez siły zbrojne RP w roku 2007"
- Nowa Technika Wojskowa nr 5/2010 "Zakupy pojazdów użytkowych klasy średniej i ciężkiej przez SZ RP w 2009 roku"
- Nowa Technika wojskowa nr 5/2011 "Zakupy pojazdów użytkowych klasy średniej i ciężkiej przez Siły Zbrojne RP w roku 2010"
- Nowa Technika Wojskowa nr 9/2011 "Jelcz 882.53 8×8" str. 126–128
- Nowa Technika Wojskowa nr 6/2012 "Zakupy średnich i ciężkich ciężarówek przez siły zbrojne RP w 2011 roku" str 42–46
- Nowa Technika Wojskowa nr 6/2012 "Jelcz-Komponenty wreszcie "na prostej"" str 47–49
