= SLT 50 Elefant =

German tractor unit and tank transporter

FAUN SLT-50 Elefant
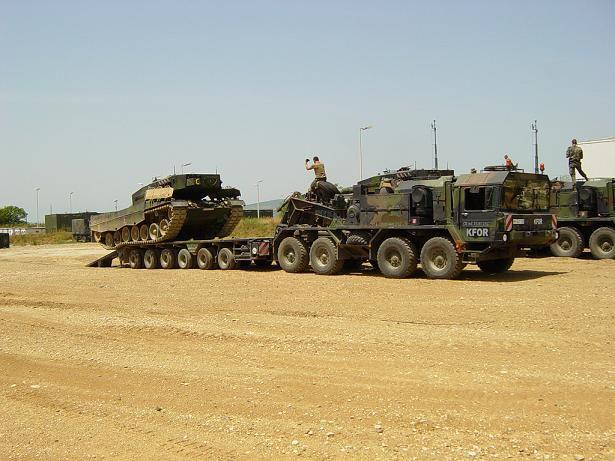
- FAUN SLT-50 Elefant with Leopard 2A4 tank loaded in Kosovo

Overview
- Type: Truck
- Manufacturer: Tadano Faun GmbH
- Production: 1971-1979

Body and chassis
- Class: Tank transporter
- Body style: COE
- Doors: 2

Powertrain
- Engine: Mercedes-Benz, Deutz
- Power output: 730hp
- Transmission: ZF 4 speed
- Hybrid drivetrain: 8x8, 8x6

Dimensions
- Length: 8.83 m
- Width: 3.07 m
- Height: 3.24 m
- Curb weight: 22.8 ton

The SLT 50 is a heavy-duty tractor unit and tank transporter used by the German Army and Polish Army.

== History ==
To replace the first generation tank transporter then in use, as well as to be able to haul the armoured vehicles then in service (among them the Leopard 1 Main Battle Tank), the German Army asked Faun GmbH to develop a new all-terrain heavy tractor, and in parallel Krupp was asked to develop the tank transport semi-trailer.

The result was the SLT 50-2 tractor and the 52-ton SaAnh semi-trailer. The combination was first tested in 1971. The first production combination was delivered in April 1976. Some 324 were built up to 1979, in one series, with tractor by Faun, and trailer by Kässbohrer, under Krupp license.

To be able to cope with the newest versions of the Leopard 2 MBT, the vehicles were upgraded from 1994 to the standard SLT 50-3. This modernization program was completed in 2000, with the vehicles expected to operate until 2015.

== Operators ==
- Germany -
- Poland - since 2002 after buying Leopard 2A4 MBTs.
- Iraq-
- Sudan-

== Specification ==
=== SLT 50-2 tractor ===
8x8 tractor.

- Length: 8.83 m
- width: 3.07 m
- height: 3.3 m
- weight: 22,800 kg
- Engine: Deutz MWM diesel TBD 234 V12. Power: 734 bhp at 2100 rpm.
- Transmission: 4-speed ZF W500-10 4PW 200 H2
- speed: 65 km/h on road, level ground.
- Range: 600 km

=== 52-ton SaAnh (Sattelanhänger) ===
52-ton semi-trailer.

- Length: 13.1 / 7.8 m (total / loading platform)
- width: 3.15 / 3.15 m (total / loading platform)
- height: n/a
- weight: 16,200 kg (unladen)
- Max.load: 52,000 kg

== See also ==
- Scammell Pioneer Semi-trailer
- SLT 56 Franziska
