= SLT 56 Franziska =

The SLT 56 is a heavy duty tractor unit and tank transporter currently in use by the German Army.

== History ==
With the deployment of the Leopard 2 MBT a need arose in the German Army for a new tank transporter which would be capable of transporting this new generation of heavier tanks. While the SLT50 Elefant tractor is an off-road vehicle with eight driven wheels, the new transporter, called SLT56, is an 8x6 tractor vehicle by Faun, the FS 42.75/42 (called Sattelzugmaschine, schwer, 8×6 (semi tractor trailer, heavy, 8x6)). The trailer is able to carry 56 tons, made by Kässbohrer, and is called Sattelanhänger 56t, Tieflader, tmil, 12×0 (semi trailer 56t, flat bed, military, 12x0).

The name Franziska for this transporter is not official, unlike the name Elefant for the SLT50.

The German Army purchased 49 of these transporters in 1989.

== Description ==
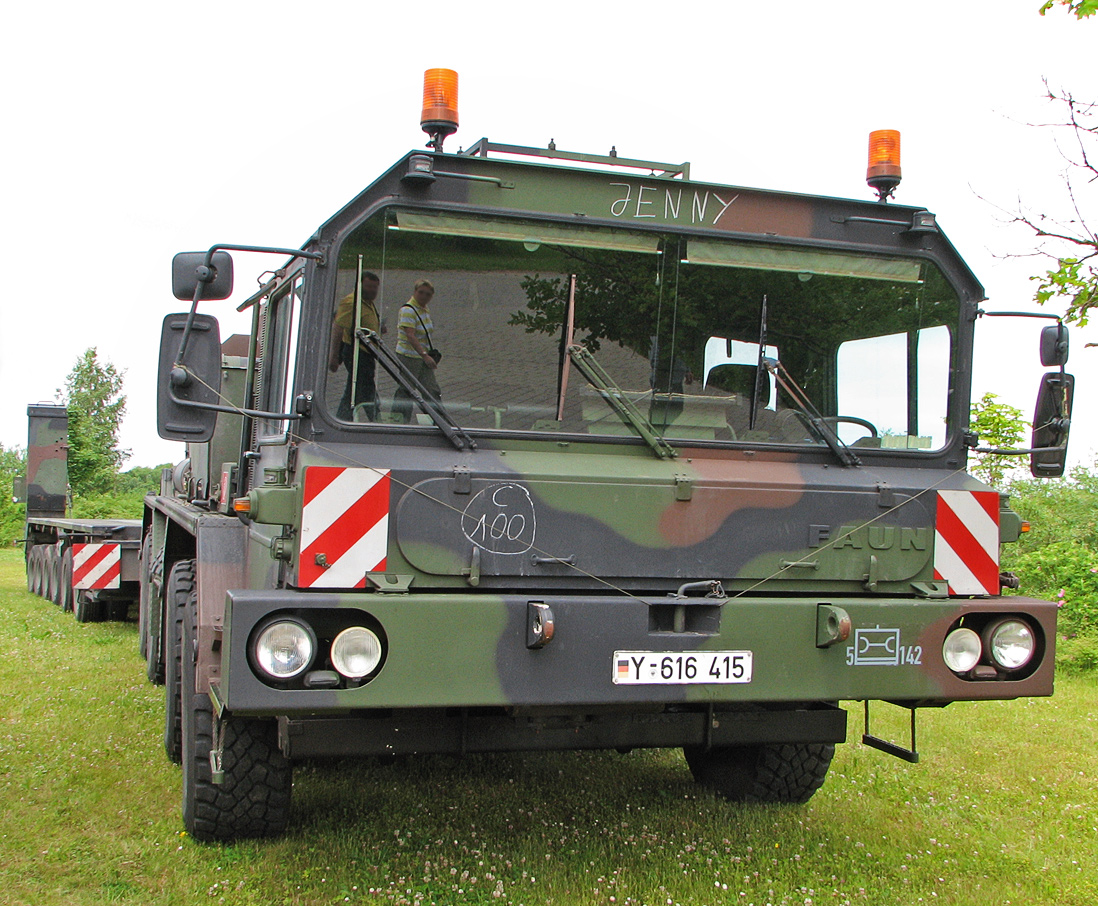
SLT 56

The heavy transporter Franziska belongs to the Bundeswehr's 3rd generation of vehicles and extends the ability to carry extra heavy tanks. While the STL56 is externally similar to the SLT 50, it is in fact an independently and completely new developed vehicle. The best way to tell the SLT56 apart from the Elefant is by the tandem lights the SLT56 carries in the front bumper, while the Elefant only has single lights. Technically, they differ in the drive train and the engine. The trailer is also different, as is the configuration of the winches and boxes. Similar to the Elefant, the SLT56 is equipped with two Rotzler winches for pulling tanks or other disabled vehicles onto the trailer. The trailer's platform measures 8.9m by 3.15m, the weight is distributed on 24 wheels, two per short axle, six of those axles per side (the front two are steerable).

In 1993 the SLT56 was modified due to the experiences while deployed with the UN in Somalia. The fenders were strengthened, the anchoring of the winch was modified, air-suspended drivers' seats were installed, and the vehicles were equipped with more storage space.

While being deployed in Somalia, the SLT56 was used with the old (Elefant's) trailer. This means that the new trailer was never used in the white UN paint scheme.

== Technical data ==
	SaZgM schwer mil (8x6) mit Anh. 56t
Type:	non-offroad tank transporter
Engine:	KHD-12-Zylinder-Diesel, turbocharged
Displacement:	19.144 cm³
Power:	386 kW (525 hp)
Cooling:	air
Transmission:	8-speed, ZF 4 S-150 GPA
Overall Length:	19.700 mm
Overall Width:	3.150 mm
Overall Height:	2.810 mm
Fording ability:	450 mm
Weight (empty):	37.700 kg
Weight (maximum):	94.500 kg
MLC:	c100
Carrying capacity:	56.000 kg
Maximum speed: with trailer 56t/ 52t with trailer 52t and cargo > 47,7 t	72,2 km/h 62 km/h 40 km/h
Fuel capacity:	800 L
Fuel consumption:	Street: 110 L per 100 km
Cruising range:	Street: 700 km
Crew:	4
Armament:	1 machine gun MG3

== Tractor trailer ==
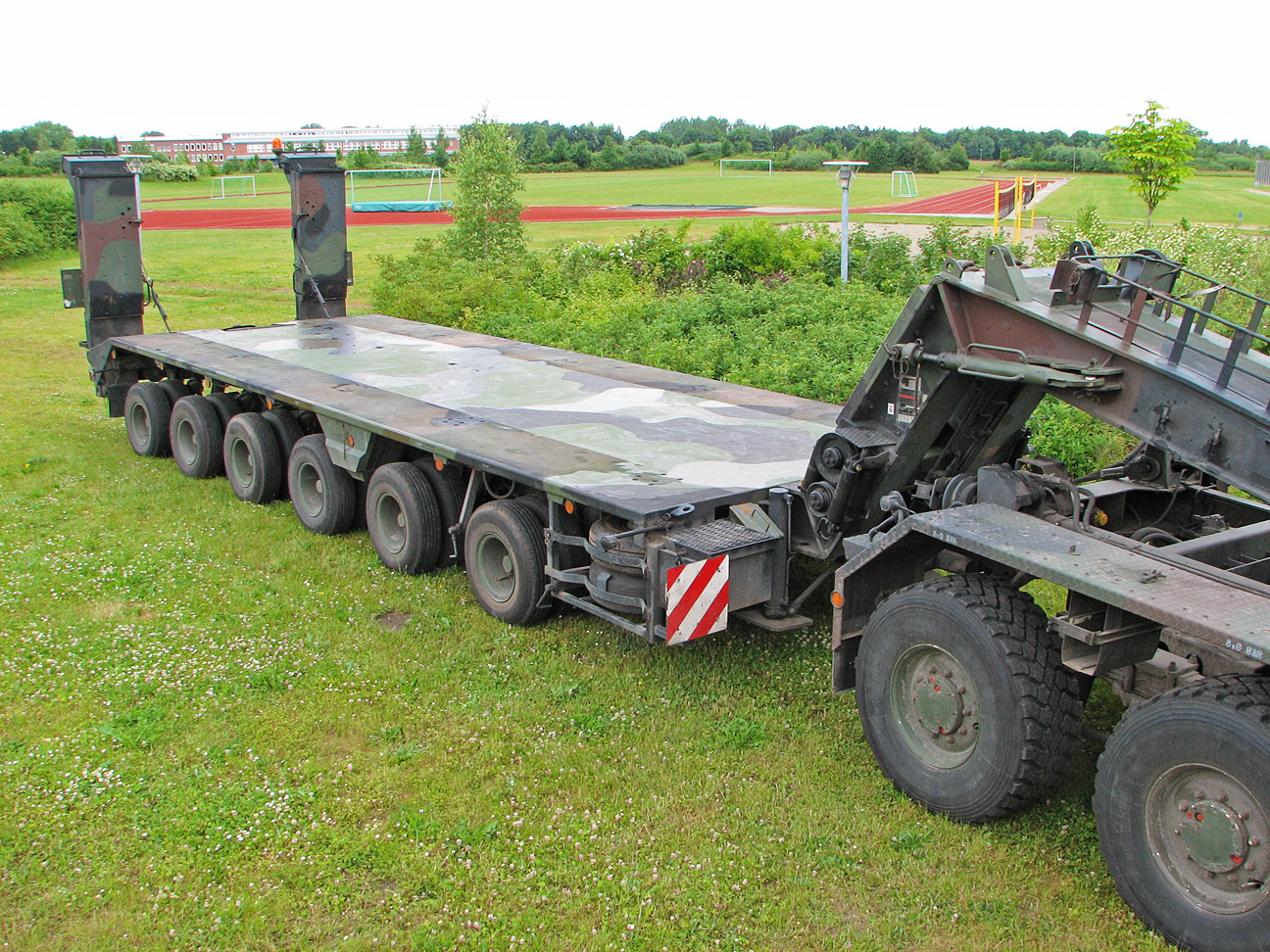
The 56t trailer

With the deployment of the new Leopard 2 variants A5 and A6 the trailer had to be modified again because of the increased weight. There is a reinforcement in the trailer neck, as well as new fenders in front of the shock absorbers and new spacers between the loading ramps. This last modification lets the ramps stand straight in the up position, making loading the long MAN 10t gl truck possible.

== Literature ==
- Josef Spurný, Jan Martinec: Bundeswehr Tank Transporters (FAUN) in detail WWP Publications, ISBN 80-86416-44-5.
