= Tank transporter =

Combination of a heavy tractor unit and mating semi-trailer used for transporting tanks

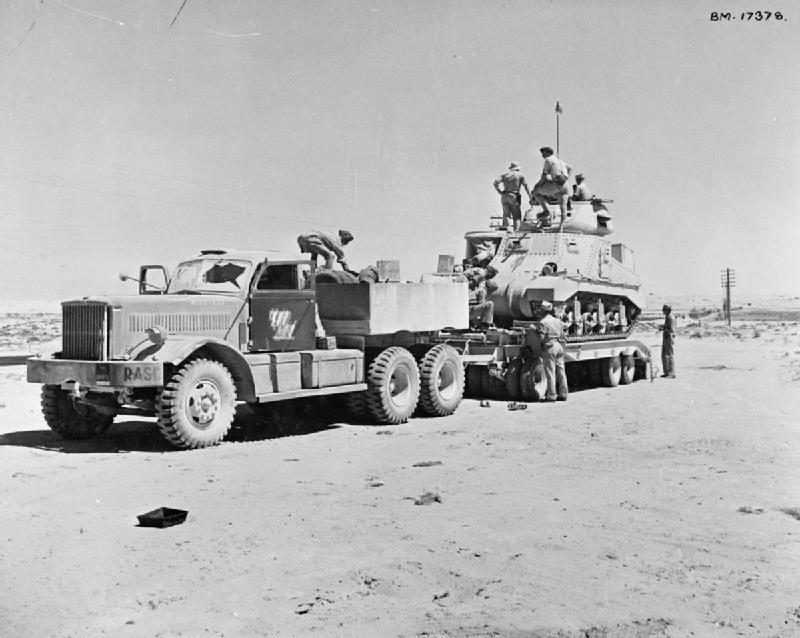
British Army M19 tank transporter, composed of an M20 tractor unit and M9 trailer loading a Grant tank in North Africa

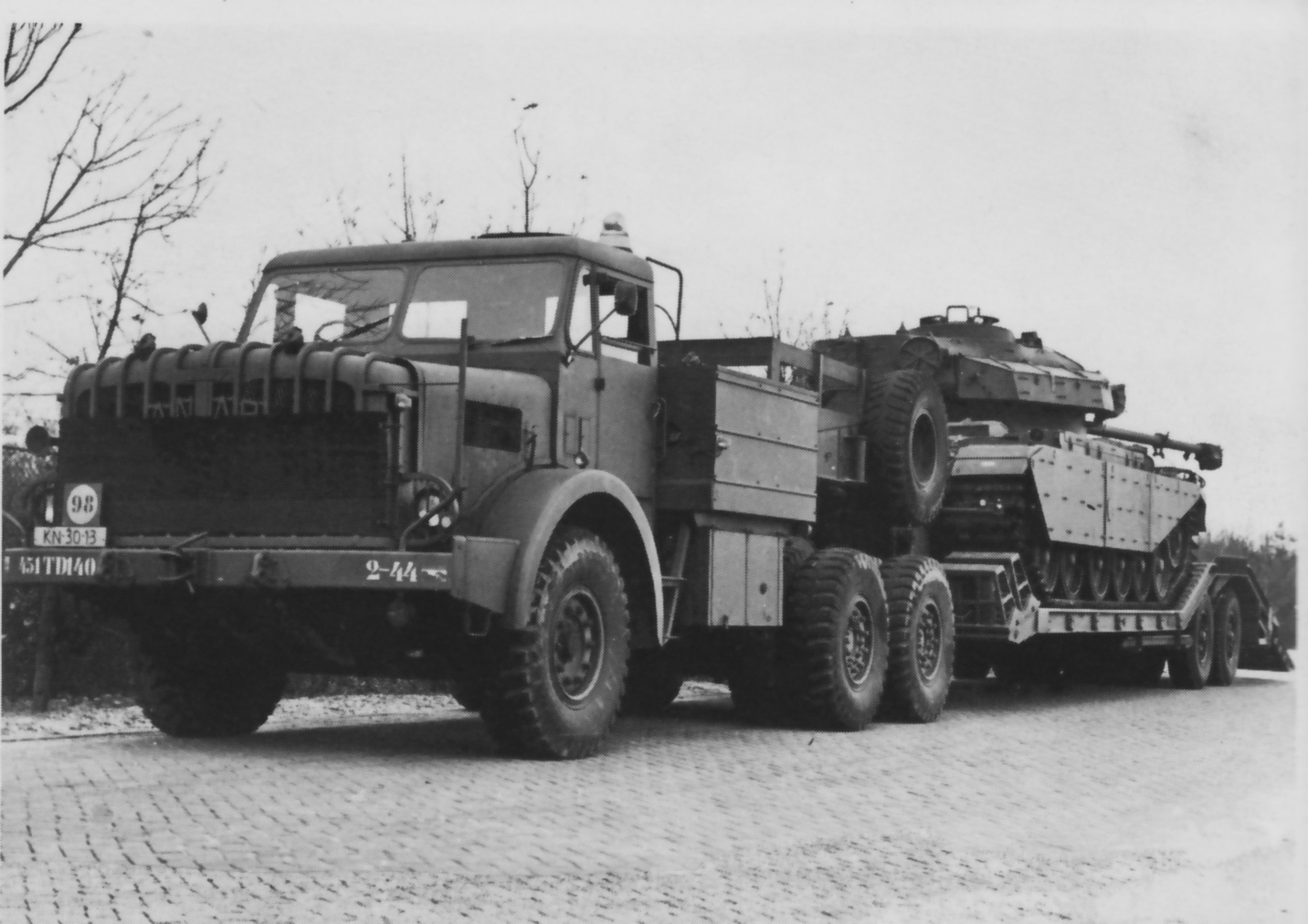
Thornycroft Antar tank transporter

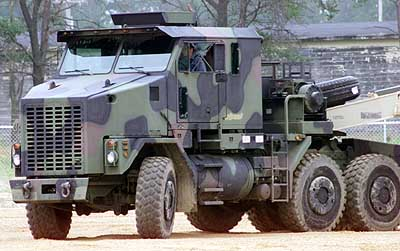
Oshkosh M1070 tractor unit of the Heavy Equipment Transport System heavy equipment and tank transporter system

A tank transporter is a combination of a heavy tractor unit or a ballast tractor and a mating full trailer, hydraulic modular trailer or semi-trailer (typically of the "lowboy" type), used for transporting tanks and other armoured fighting vehicles. Some also function as tank recovery vehicles, the tractors of which may be armoured for protection in combat conditions.

Used on roads, tank transporters reduce the wear and tear on tracks and the other components of the powertrains of tracked vehicles. They also conserve fuel, are less damaging of road surfaces, and reduce tank crew fatigue. Overall, they are more efficient at moving tanks at higher speeds and longer distances than the tanks themselves.

== Chassis designs ==
Three chassis designs have been used, generally in this order over time as loads became heavier, although there are exceptions.

=== Rigid chassis ===
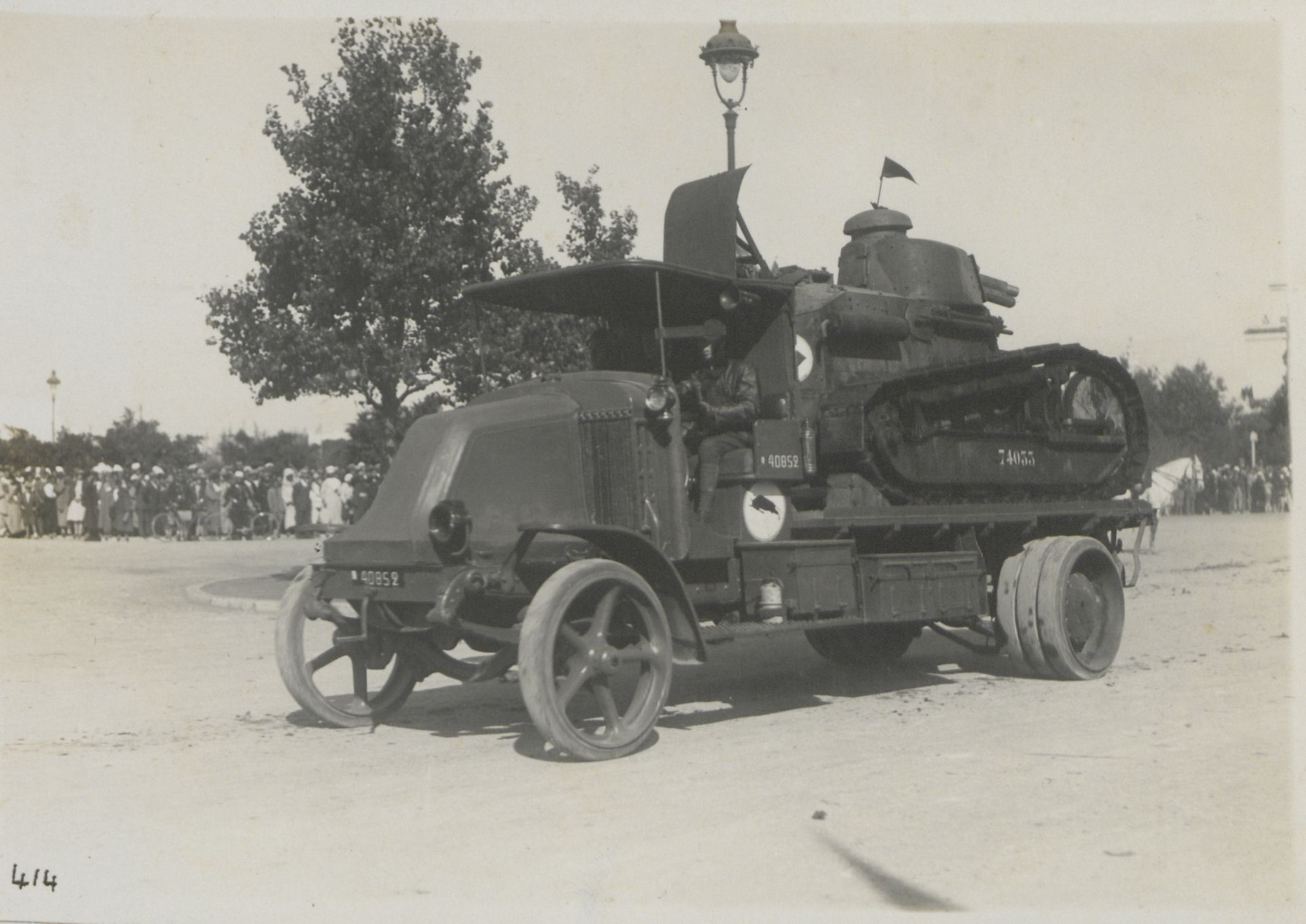
A French Renault FT tank carried on a Renault FU truck, 1929. Both were produced from 1917.

The lighter tanks of World War I and the interwar period were carried on simple rigid flatbed lorries.

=== Trailers ===
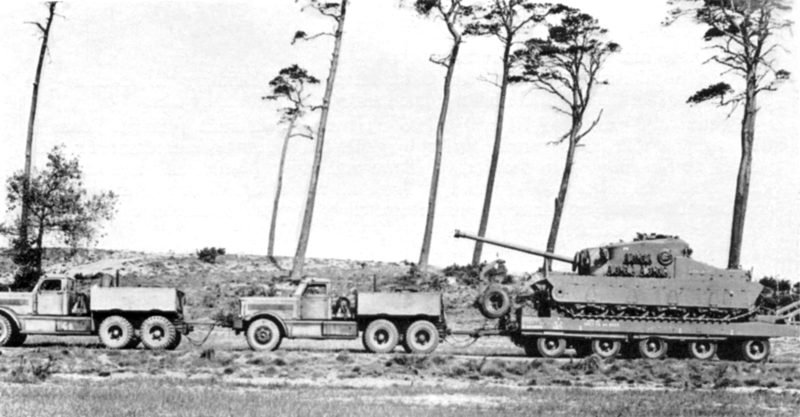
The A39 Tortoise being towed on a trailer by two Diamond Ts during trials in BAOR, 1948

As the weight of tanks became too great for lorry chassis, separate trailers were developed. These carried the entire weight of the tank on their own wheels, putting no weight onto the tractor unit. They are pulled by a ballast tractor connected to a drawbar.

The simplest trailer designs have only two axles, but heavier loads frequently require more than this. Multiple wheels per axle are common, usually four, sometimes a hydraulic modular trailer is employed that can have eight or more axles, which are hydraulically steerable and height adjusted.

One advantage of ballast tractors is that they are capable of double heading, where two tractor units are coupled to pull a hydraulic modular trailer.

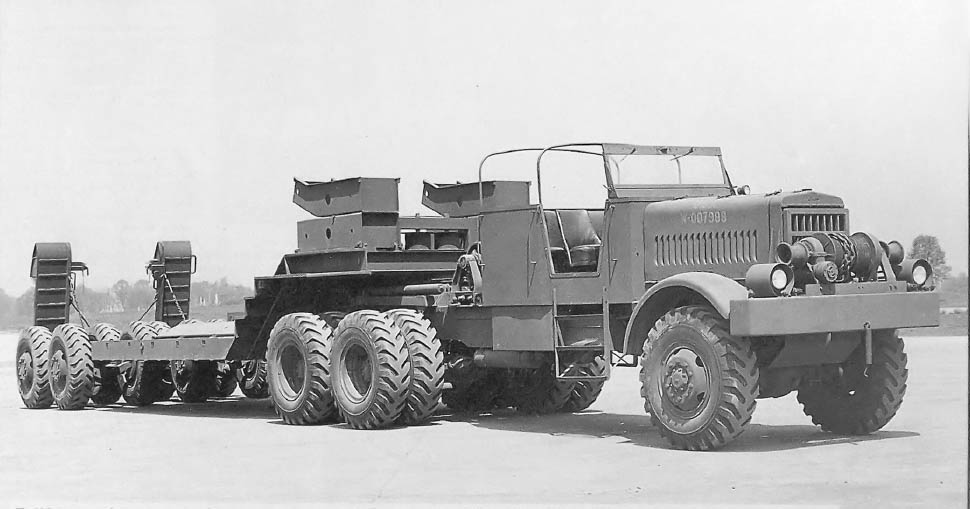
Tank recovery unit T3 including Dart truck tractor T13 and trailer T28

Other attempts have been made around 1942 with heavy-trucks, as known for the Dart T13 tank tractor.

==== Steering ====
Some designs, such as the 1928 Aldershot design, grouped pairs of axles at each end of the trailer.

Others, such as the 70-ton Cranes trailer used to carry the Second World War-era Tortoise heavy assault tank, had five axles, spaced along the length of the trailer. The end-wheel designs have the advantages of easier steering and better moveability across rough ground. Those with axles throughout their length must have suspension that allows the axles to move and also allow some steering. This makes them more complicated to manufacture. Placing the wheels at the ends also allows the chassis to dip down into a "well", giving a lower centre of gravity during transport. The Cranes trailer had a frame split into two sections of two and three axles, with a carrying bed above them. The outermost four axles had Ackermann steering for their wheels.

The German Sd.Ah.116 trailer of World War II had a steersman's position on the rear bogie.

=== Semi-trailers ===
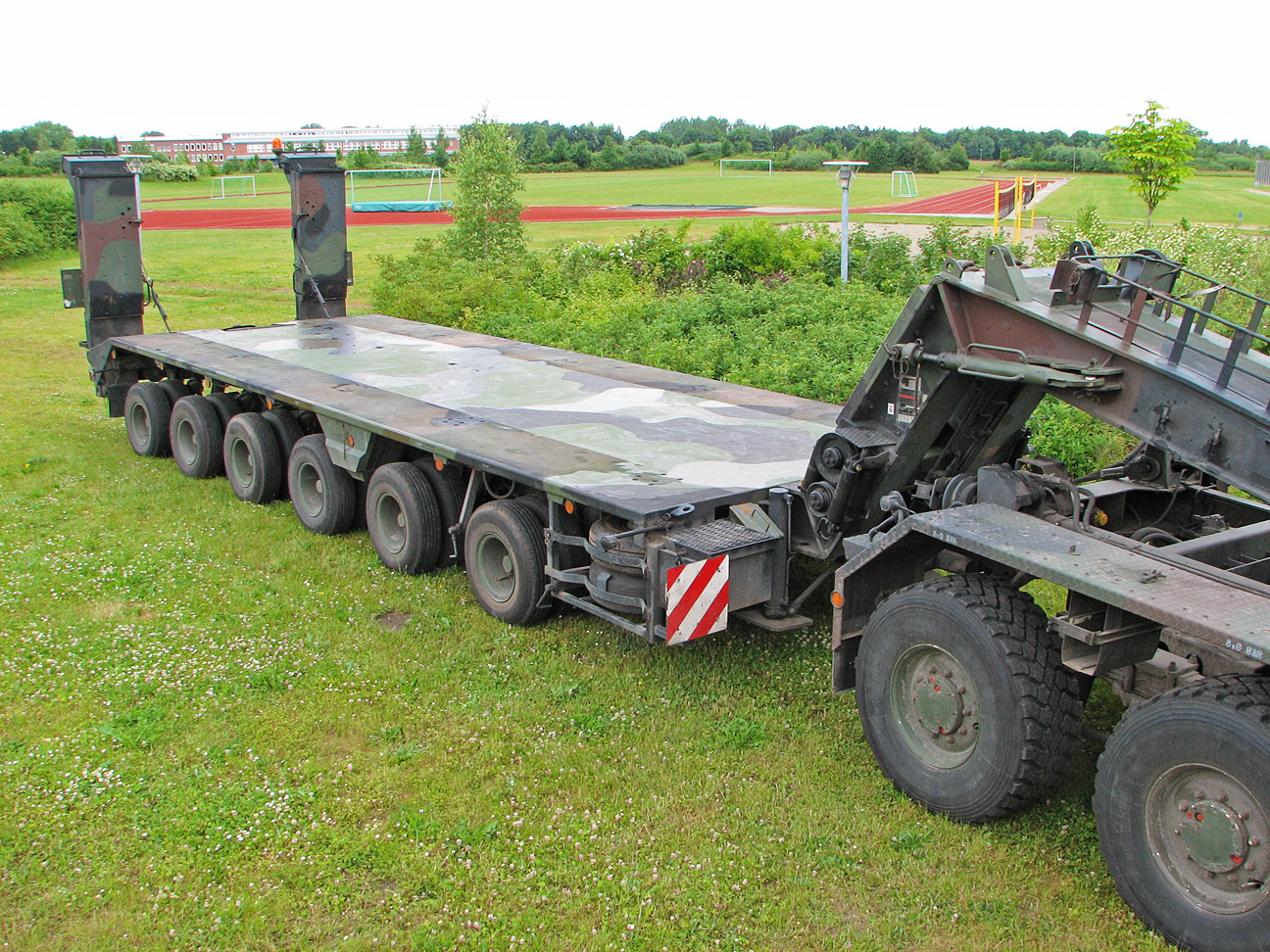
SLT multi-axle semi-trailer

The ballast tractor for a drawbar trailer must be comparable in weight to its load if it is to have traction, which means that the total weight of the tractor-trailer combination might be as much as twice the useful load. However, by using a semi-trailer, some of the load's weight is carried by the tractor. This avoids the need to ballast the tractor, making a greater proportion of the total weight available for the load.

Semi-trailers cannot be moved on their own, or pushed and pulled by ballast tractors. They are only mobile when connected to the correct tractor unit, which can limit their use in recovery.

The simplest semi-trailer is "half of a trailer", having wheels at the rear only and an articulated connection to the tractor unit. A strong metal post or kingpin on the trailer fits into a socket or 'fifth wheel' on the tractor.

Lowboy semi-trailers are commonly used to keep the load's center of mass low, as they have a low horizontal bed, with a gooseneck that rises up at the front to connect to the tractor unit.

As with drawbar trailers, it is simplest if all the axles of a semi-trailer are concentrated at the rear, away from the tractor unit. However, heavier loads may require more axles, and steering gear may be needed at the front of the semi-trailer.

== Loading ==
=== Ramps ===
The simplest means of loading the transporter is with a pair of hinged ramps at the rear. The load then drives up the ramps and onto the trailer under its own power. As tracked vehicles exist for their mobility across obstacles, they usually have no difficulty in doing this (however, see the "Power for loading" section below.)

==== Tilt beds ====
The Cranes trailer described above uses an entire see-saw tilting bed (and two small ramps). A manual hydraulic pump tilts the empty bed, bringing the loading end close to the ground. The tank drives up, then once past the see-saw fulcrum the bed tilts back under its weight.

==== Demountable axles ====
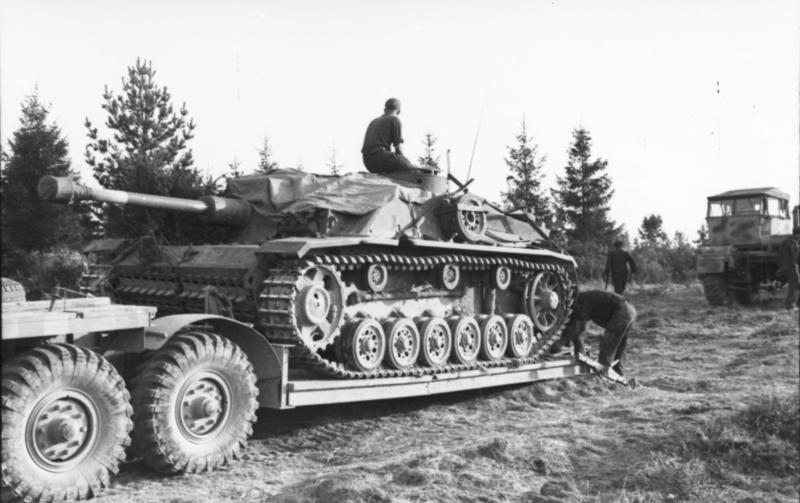
Loading a StuG III Ausf G assault gun onto a Sd.Ah.116 demountable trailer, 1943

Some designs use a demountable axle, where the axle detaches from the bed of the trailer. Access to the load bed is now through low ramps, without needing to climb over the height of the wheels. Again, the intention is to keep centre of gravity low.

=== Power for loading ===
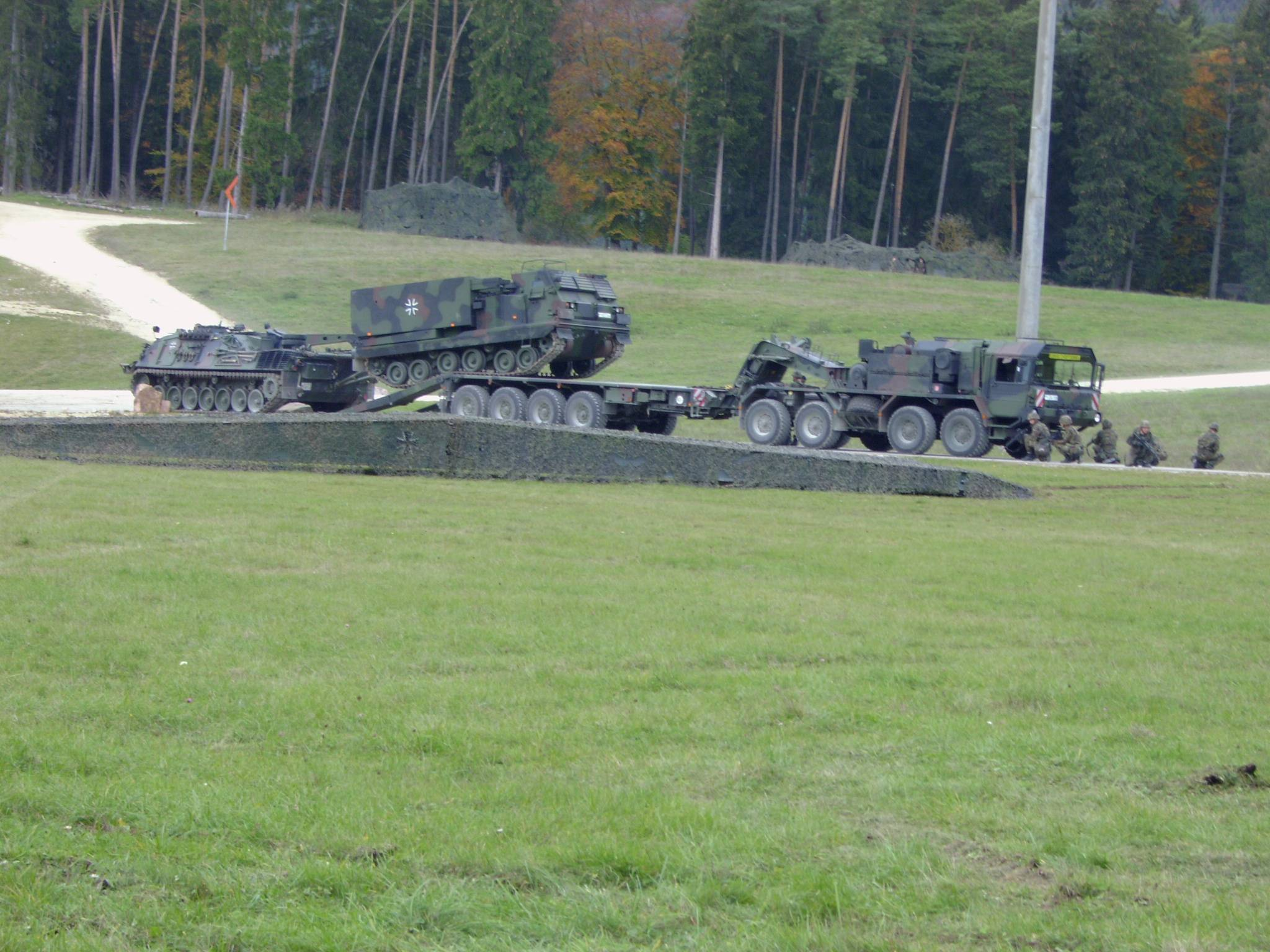
Loading a disabled vehicle on SLT 50 Elefant by pushing with an armoured recovery vehicle of the German Army

Although an operational vehicle can be driven on-board under its own power, this is a delicate operation, particularly with tracked vehicles, as their precise steering is limited. In particular, neutral steering, where one track goes forward and one backward causing the tank to turn on the spot, is likely to either damage the trailer bed or to cause the vehicle to fall off.

A few transporters have been fitted with winches for loading, but this is uncommon. More commonly, a disabled vehicle is loaded with the assistance of a recovery tractor, either winching or pushing it on board.

== Tank recovery vehicles ==
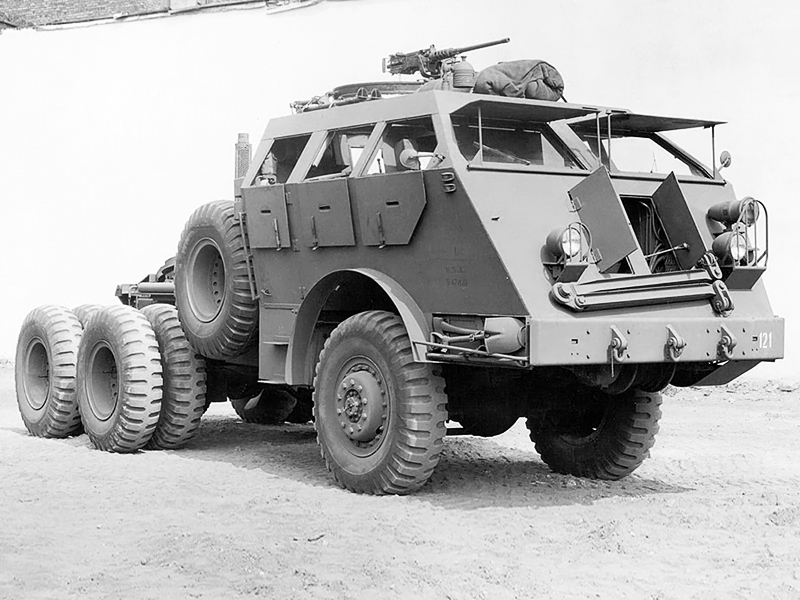
An M26 armoured tank transporter tractor unit

Some tank transports are equipped with winches or cranes to also serve as tank recovery vehicles. Some are armoured recovery vehicles. Tanks are usually deployed in groups, with an equal number of transporters to support them. Recovery vehicles are more complex and more expensive and thus only a limited number are produced.

For similar reasons, tank transporters are rarely armoured to recover tanks under fire, although tracked recovery vehicles frequently are. A rare few have been, such as the M26 "Dragon Wagon" of World War II.

== Individual models ==
Truck model	Origins	Years in use	Users
Scammell Pioneer semi-trailer as "Scammell 20-ton semi-trailer recovery tank transporter" and "30-ton semi-trailer recovery tank transporter"	United Kingdom	1930s–1940s	British Army, Indian Army
White-Ruxtall 922	United States	1940s	British Army
Mack EXBX 18-ton tank transporter	United States	1940s	French Army, (Note: Note: the French ordered a number of EXBX's but the Fall of France in 1940 before the vehicles could be delivered caused the order to be diverted to Britain.) British Army
Sd.Kfz. 9/18-ton heavy tank transporter Sd.Ah.116	Nazi Germany	1940s	Nazi German Army – Wehrmacht
Diamond T tank transporter	United States	1940s–1970s	British Army, US Army, Dutch Army, Indian Army
Thorneycroft 'Mighty' Antar with 'FV30011 semi-trailer 50-ton tank transporter'	United Kingdom	1940s–1986	British Army, Dutch Army, Indian Army
Type 82 HET – Hanyang Special Auto Works (Hanyang Special Vehicle Works) HY473 tractor and HY962 semi-trailer	People's Republic of China	1960s	People's Liberation Army
MAZ-537G tank transporter	Soviet Union	1960s	Soviet Army, Russian Army, Indian Army, People's Liberation Army, Korean People's Army and various other Eastern Bloc nations
Oshkosh Corporation Commercial Heavy Equipment Transporter (C-HET)- M746 or M911 tractor with M747 semitrailer	United States	1970s–1990s	US Army
Floor Truck Factory	Netherlands	1970s–?	Dutch Army
Faun SLT 50-3 Elefant and SLT-56	West Germany	1970s–?	West Germany Army / German Army, Polish Army (since 2002)
Mitsubishi Fuso Truck and Bus Corporation JGSDF Type 73/74 heavy tank transport	Japan	1973–	Japan Ground Self-Defense Force
Volvo N1233	Sweden	1977–	Swedish Army
KZKT-7428 tank transporter	Soviet Union / Russian Federation	1980s	Soviet Army, Russian Army
Scammell Commander	United Kingdom	1986–2002	British Army
Faun SLT 56 Franziska with Kässbohrer semi-trailer	West Germany	1989–	West German Army / German Army
Oshkosh Corporation Heavy Equipment Transport System	United States	1993–	US Army, British Army (since 2002)
Scania T144	Sweden	1998–	Swedish Army, Belgian Army and French Army
Land Mobility Technologies modified Mercedes-Benz Actros Armored Heavy Support Vehicle Systems	Germany / South Africa	2000s–	Canadian Forces – on order 2007 (delivery 2008–2009)
DAF Trucks DAF YTZ95.530 (DAF XF) 95 Tropco tractor and trailer	Netherlands	2005–	Dutch Army, Canadian Forces – loaded from Dutch (2007–2009)
Jak tank transporter - Jelcz C882.62 with DEMARKO S.A. trailers.	Poland	2022-–	Polish Land Forces

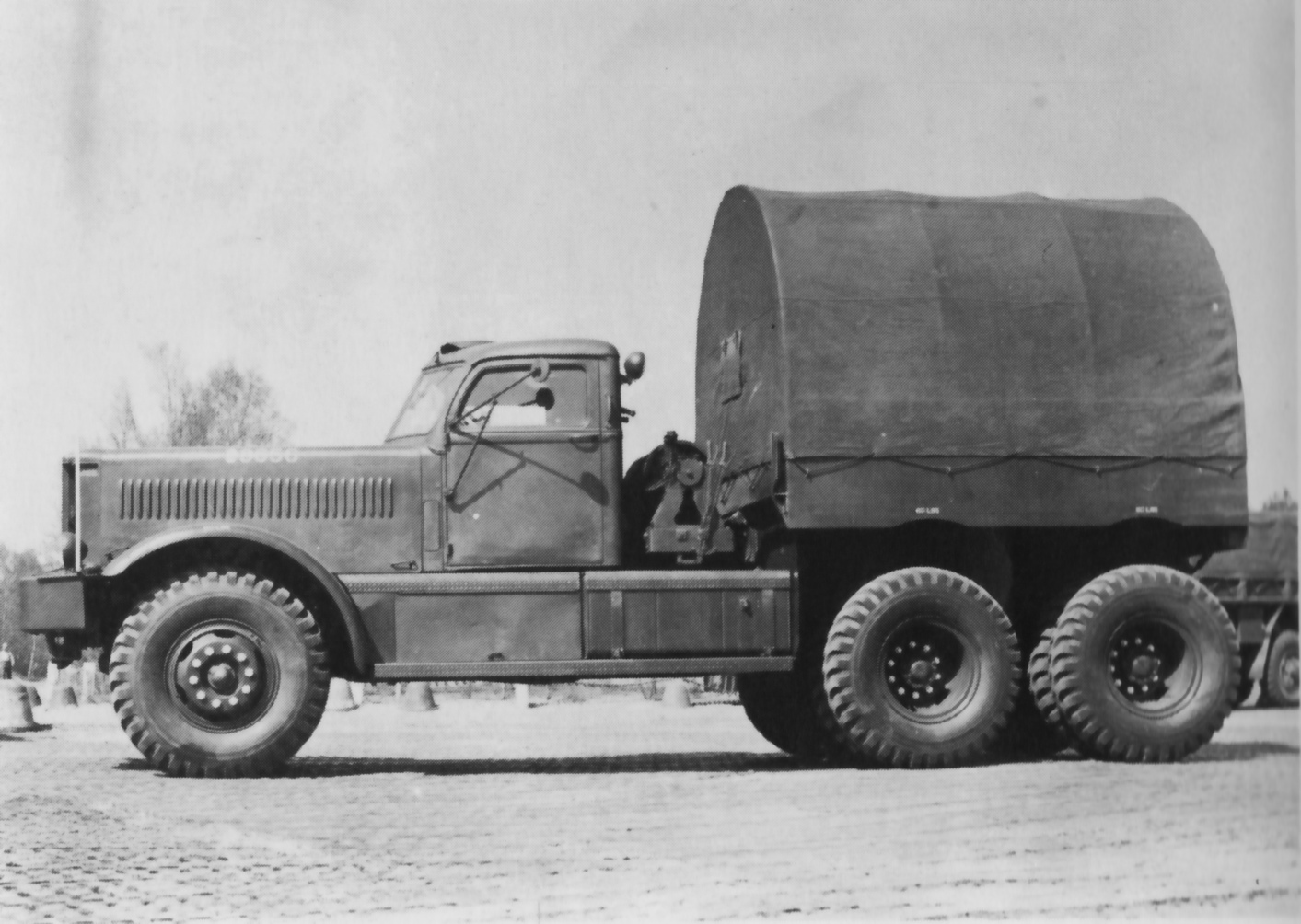
Diamond T M20 ballast tractor

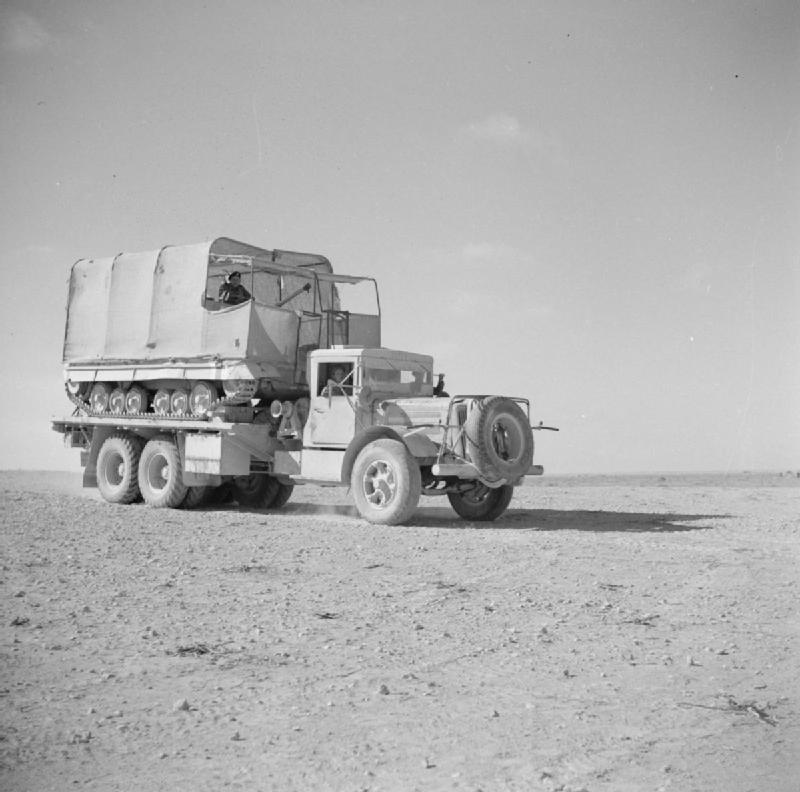
White-Ruxtall 922 transporting a disguised Valentine tank in North Africa

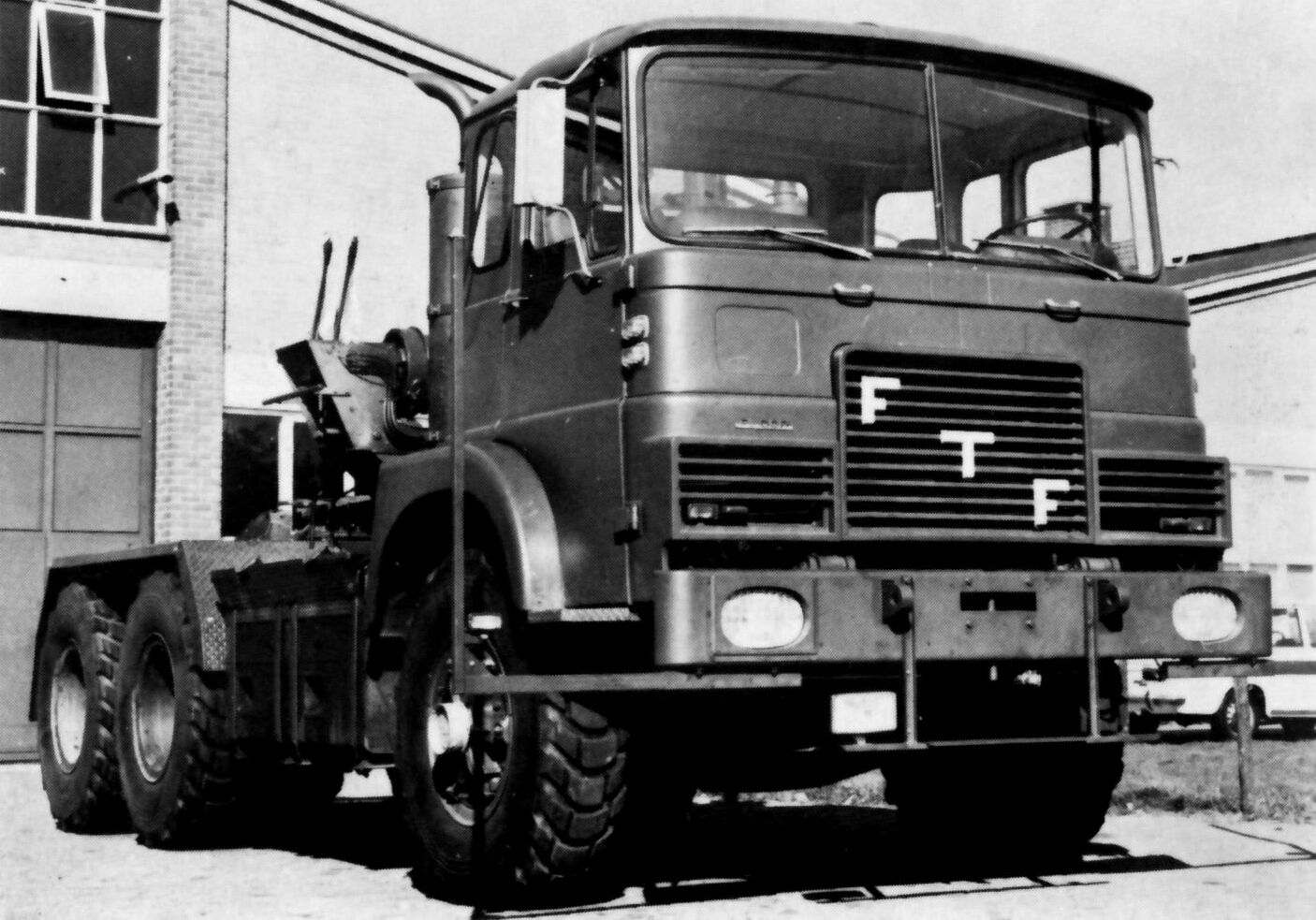
FTF tank transporter tractor unit built by Floor Truck Factory in the Netherlands

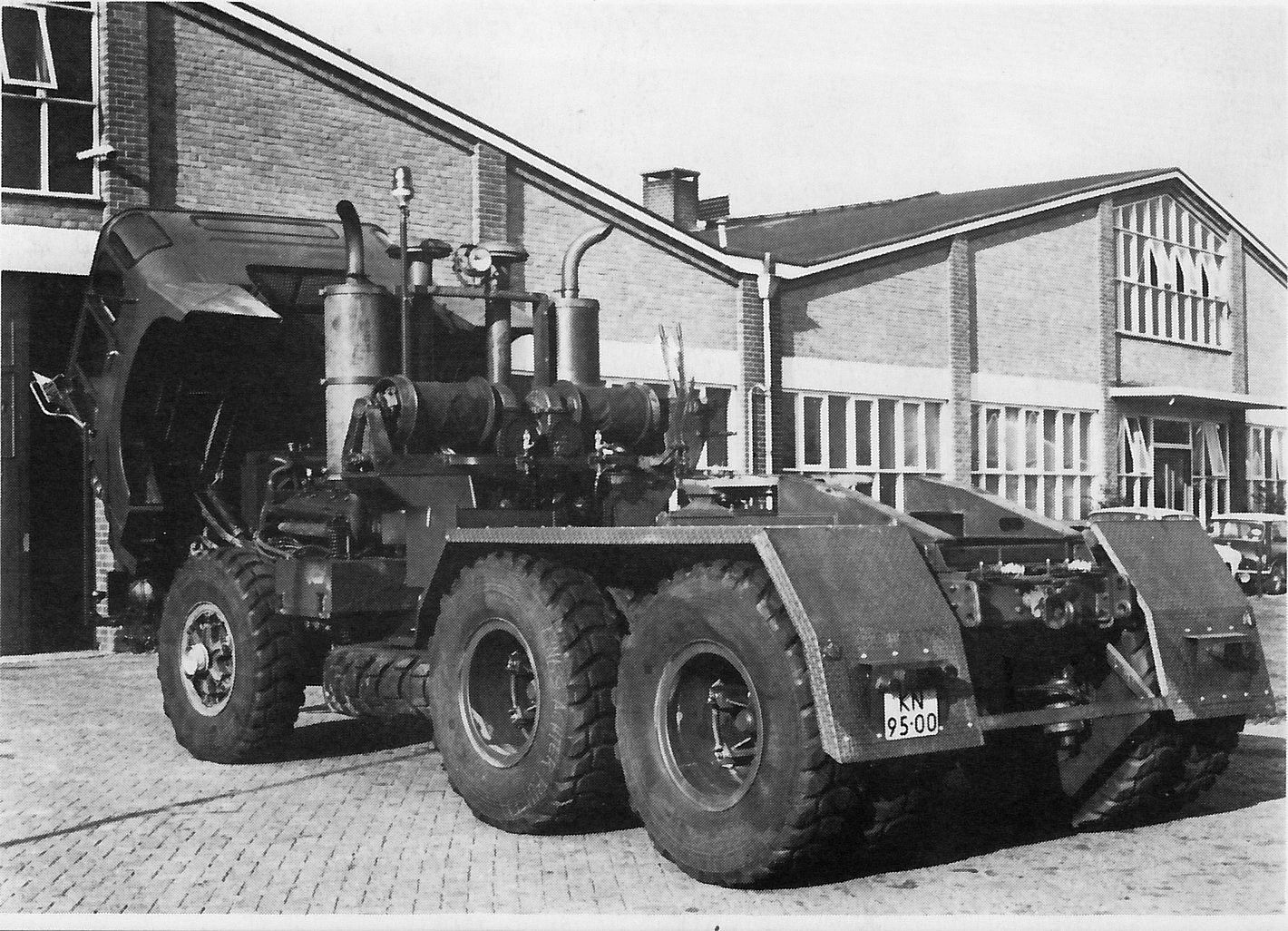
The FTF tractor had a 475 hp Detroit two-stroke diesel engine with Roots blower

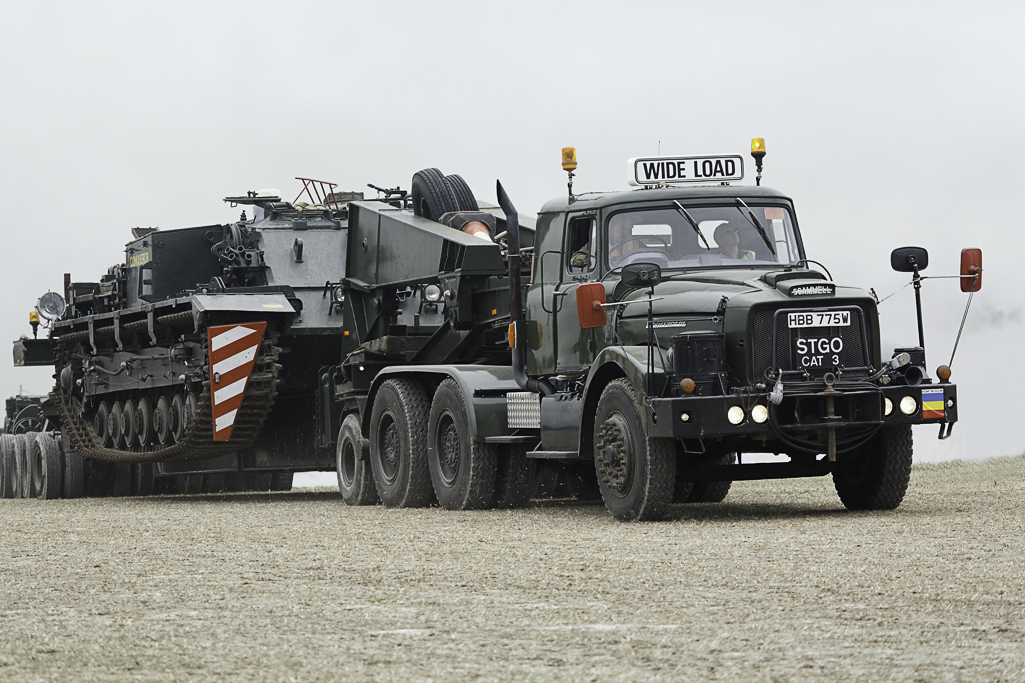
Scammell Contractor hauling Conqueror ARV2 FV222 tank recovery vehicle (REME)

== See also ==
- Artillery tractor
- Flatcar – used to transport tanks where railroad tracks are available
- List of U.S. military vehicles by model number
