= List of military trucks =

This list includes military trucks, are in production for 2021. Previous models are in a separate table, which is below.

In the column "Company" indicates the manufacturer of the truck, in the column "truck" model name is indicated, in the column "image" is a photograph of the model, in the "Type" column indicates the type of model payloads, here is submitted designations such as "chassis for missile launchers units", "tankovoz "pickup"; in the column "years of production" represents years of release. Some images provided below may show the outdated model

This is not a complete list

== Current vehicles ==
Company	Truck	Image	Class	Is there a civilian version	Years in Production	The armies which countries used
ACMAT	VLRA 2		middle/heavy truck	no	2009–present	France, United Kingdom, Ireland, Kenya, Cyprus, Zimbabwe, Chile, Chad
ACMAT	ALTV		light truck	no	2009–present	Afghanistan
Automotive Industries	AIL Storm M-243		light truck	no	1987–present	Israel
Automotive Industries	AIL Abir II		light truck			Israel
AM General	AM General Humvee M1097A2		light truck	no	1984–present	United States, Tunisia
Ashok Leyland Defence Systems	Ashok Leyland Super Stallion		heavy	no		India
Astra	Astra SM(HD)		heavy truck/tractor	no	2000–present	Italy
Astra	Astra HD		heavy trucks/tractor	yes	1995–present	Italy, Bangladesh
BeiBen Truck	BeiBen 1928		heavy truck	yes	-present	Bangladesh
Bryansky Avtomobilny Zavod	BAZ-64022		heavy tractor	no	2007–present	Russia
Bryansky Avtomobilny Zavod	BAZ-69096		special wheeled chassis	yes	1998–present	Russia
Bryansky Avtomobilny Zavod	BAZ-6909		special wheeled chassis	yes	1998–present	Russia
Bryansky Avtomobilny Zavod	BAZ-6306		ballast tractor	no	2007–present	Russia
Bryansky Avtomobilny Zavod	BAZ-6910		special wheeled chassis	no	2004–present	Russia
DAF Trucks	DAF Tropco		heavy tractor	yes	1998–present	Netherlands, Canada
Dongfeng Motor	EQ240/EQ2081		heavy truck	no	1974–present	China
Dongfeng Motor	EQ245/EQ2100		middle truck	yes	1988–present	China
Dongfeng Motor	DF-21		heavy tractor	no		China
Fabrika automobila Priboj	FAP 1118		heavy truck	no		Serbia, Montenegro
Fabrika automobila Priboj	FAP 2026			no		Serbia, Bosnia and Herzegovina, Montenegro
Fabrika automobila Priboj	FAP 2228		heavy truck	no		Serbia, Montenegro
Fabrika automobila Priboj	FAP 3240		heavy truck	no		Serbia
FAW Group	FAW CA142		middle truck	yes	1992–present	China
FAW Group			middle truck	yes		China
GAZ	GAZ Sadko		midsize truck	yes	1997–present	Russia, Azerbaijan, Syria, Armenia
Hino	Hino 700		heavy truck/tractor	yes	2006–present	Nicaragua, Thailand
Hino	Hino Ranger		medium/heavy truck	yes	1964–present	Armenia
Isuzu	Type 73		heavy truck	no	1973–present	Japan
Isuzu	Isuzu Forward		medium truck	yes	1966–present	Bangladesh
Iveco	Iveco Trakker		heavy truck/tractor	yes	2005–present	Italy, Poland, Brazil, Tunisia, Argentina, Bangladesh
Iveco	Iveco EuroCargo		middle truck	yes		Italy, Poland, Spain, Belgium, Tunisia, Argentina, Bangladesh
Iveco	Iveco Stralis		heavy truck	yes	2002–present	Argentina, Netherlands
Iveco	Iveco ACL		middle truck	no	1980-s-present	Italy
Iveco	Iveco ACTL		heavy truck/tractor	no	2000–present	Italy
Jelcz-Komponenty	Jelcz 442		heavy truck	no	2004–present	Poland
Jelcz-Komponenty	Jelcz 662		heavy chassis/truck	no	2000–present	Poland
Jelcz-Komponenty	Jelcz 862		heavy chassis/tractor	no	2000–present	Poland
Kamaz	KamAZ-4350 Mustang		middle truck	no	2002–present	Russia
Kamaz	KamAZ-43501		landing middle truck	no	2003–present	Russia
Kamaz	KamAZ-43114		heavy truck	yes	1995–present	Russia, Azerbaijan, Syria
Kamza	KamAZ-43118		heavy truck	yes	1995–present	Russia, UN
Kamaz	KamAZ-4326		middle truck	yes	1995–present	Russia, UN, Bangladesh
Kamaz	KamAZ-5350 Mustang		heavy truck/tractor	no	2002–present	Russia, Ukraine
Kamaz	KamAZ-6350		heavy truck	no	2002–present	Russia
Kamaz	KamAZ-65224		extra heavy truck	no	2005–present	Russia, Bangladesh
Kamaz	KamAZ-65225		tractor (tank transporter)	yes	2010–present	Russia, Algeria
Kamaz	KamAZ-6560		special chassis	yes	2005–present	Russia
Kia	Kia KM250		medium truck	no	1978–present	South Korea, Philippines
KrAZ	KrAZ-6322		heavy truck	yes	1994–present	Ukraine, Angola, Greece, China, India, Indonesia, Yemen, Georgia, Egypt, Iraq, Iran, Syria, Thailand, Turkmenistan
KrAZ	KrAZ-6446		heavy tractor	yes	1994–present	Ukraine and other (?)
KrAZ	KrAZ-5233		heavy truck	yes	2008–present	Ukraine, Nigeria
Krauss-Maffei Wegmann/Rheinmetall	Mungo ESK		light truck with armoured cab	no	2005–present	Germany (Airmobile Operations Division and Division Special Operations)
Mack Defence	Mack Granite MILCOTS		heavy truck	yes		United States, Canada, UN
Mack Defence	Mack Vision MILCOTS		tractor	yes		United States, Canada, UN
Mack Defence	Mack Sherpa Carrier		light/medium truck	no		?
Mack Defence	Mack Sherpa Medium		heavy truck	no		?
Mack Defence	Mack Kerax		heavy truck with armoured cab	no		?
Mercedes-Benz	Mercedes-Benz Unimog U5000		medium truck	yes	2000–present	Germany, Argentina, Great Britain, Belgium, Denmark, Netherlands, France, Ireland, Indonesia, Portugal, Finland, Estonia, Greece, Switzerland, Chile, Bolivian Naval Force, Mexico, Pakistan, Paraguay, Singapore, Brazilian Marine Corps, South Africa, New Zealand, Turkey, Australia, China, Tunisia
Mercedes-Benz	Mercedes-Benz Zetros		heavy truck	yes	2008–present	Germany, Bulgaria, Syria, Chile, Algeria
Mercedes-Benz	Mercedes-Benz Axor		heavy truck	yes	2005–present	Germany, Brazil, Chile, Algeria
Mercedes-Benz	Mercedes-Benz L-1214 4x4		truck	yes		Brazil
Mercedes-Benz	Mercedes-Benz Actros		heavy truck/tractor (include with armoured cab)	yes	1997–present	Germany, Canada, Chile Singapore, Finland, New Zealand, Afghanistan, Albania, Algeria
Mercedes-Benz	Mercedes-Benz Atego		medium truck	yes	1998–present	Argentina, Azerbaijan
Mercedes-Benz	Mercedes-Benz 2624		heavy truck	yes	1959–present	Argentina
Minsk Automobile Plant	MAZ-6317		heavy truck	yes	1991–present	Belarus
Minsk Automobile Plant	MAZ-6425		tractor	yes	1991–present	Belarus, Azerbaijan, Turkmenistan
Mitsubishi Fuso	Type 74		heavy truck/tractor	yes	1985–present	Japan
Mitsubishi Fuso	Mitsubishi Fuso Super Great		heavy truck	yes	1983–present	Bangladesh
Mowag	Mowag Duro		medium/heavy truck	no	1994–present	Switzerland, Germany, Venezuela, United Kingdom
MZKT	MZKT-74295		tractor (tank transporter)	yes	1998–present	Belarus
MZKT	MZKT-741351		tractor (tank transporter)	no	2016–present	Belarus, United Arab Emirates
MZKT	MZKT-79221		special wheeled chassis for mobile rocket launcher Topol-M	no	1992–present	Russia
MZKT	MZKT-7930		special wheeled chassis	no	2006–present	Russia (as chassis for mobile rocket launcher)
MZKT	MZKT-8021		special wheeled chassis	no	2000–present	Russia (as chassis of missile launcher S125 Pechora-M), Turkmenistan
MZKT	MZKT-8022		special wheeled chassis	no	2000–present	Russia
MZKT	MZKT-5002		medium truck	no		Belarus
MZKT	MZKT-6001		heavy truck	no	2008–present	Belarus, United Arab Emirates
MZKT	MZKT-6002		heavy truck	no		Belarus, United Arab Emirates
Navistar Defence	MMTV		medium truck	no	2005–present	Taiwan, Tunisia
Navistar Defence	Navistar 7000 series		heavy truck	yes	2005–present	Afghanistan, Bulgaria (Air Force), Canada, Iraq, Colombia (Marine Corps), Tunisia
Navistar Defence	International 5000 MV		tractor with armoured cab	yes		Saudi Arabia
Oshkosh	FMTV		heavy truck/tractor with armoured cab	no	2010–present	United States, Jordan, Iraq, Thailand, Tunisia, Afghanistan, Argentina
Oshkosh	HET		heavy tractor	no	1992–present	United States, Saudi Arabia, Tunisia, Iraq, United Kingdom, Morocco, Egypt, Jordan, Thailand, Greece
Oshkosh	HEMTT		heavy truck/tractor	no	1982–present	Egypt, Greece, Iraq, Israel, Morocco, Saudi Arabia, Taiwan, Turkey, United States
Oshkosh	LVS/LVSR		extra heavy truck/tractor	no	2008–present	United States, Egypt
Oshkosh	Medium Tactical Vehicle Replacement		heavy truck/tractor	no	2005–present	United States (Marine Corps and Seabee), Egypt, Iraq
Oshkosh	MTT		medium truck	no	2006–present	Egypt
Renault Trucks Defence	Renault Sherpa Medium 5 and 10		heavy truck	no	2011–present	France
Renault Trucks Defence	Renault Kerax		heavy truck/tractor (include versions with armoured cab)	yes	1996–present	France, Bangladesh
Renault Trucks Defence	Renault Trucks K		heavy truck	yes	2013–present	Bangladesh
Rheinmetall MAN Military Vehicles	MAN HX		heavy truck/tractor	no	2004–present (see Rheinmetall MAN Military Vehicles)	Germany, Austria, Netherlands, Australia
Rheinmetall MAN Military Vehicles	MAN SX		heavy truck/tractor	no	2005–present	Germany, United Kingdom, New Zealand
Rheinmetall MAN Military Vehicles	MAN TGA		heavy truck	yes	2000–present	Germany
Rheinmetall MAN Military Vehicles	MAN TGM		medium truck	yes	2000–present	Austria, Germany
Rheinmetall MAN Military Vehicles	MAN TGS		heavy truck	yes	–present	Austria
Roman	Roman DFAEG		heavy truck	no	1974–present	Romania
Roman	Roman DFE		heavy truck	yes	1971–present	Romania, Iraq
Scania	Scania R-series		heavy truck/tractor	yes	2010–present	Sweden, Netherlands
Shaanxi	SX2110		medium truck	no	–present	Bangladesh
Shaanxi	SX2190		heavy truck	no		China
Shaanxi	SX4400		heavy tractor	no		China
Sinotruk	Sinotruk Howo		heavy truck	yes		China
Sisu Defence	Sisu A2045		heavy truck	no	2008=present	Finland
Sisu Defence	Sisu 6×6		extra heavy	no	2008–present	Finland, Estonia
Sisu Defence	Sisu E13TP 8×8		extra heavy truck	no	2006–present	Finland, Estonia, Lithuania
SNVI	SNVI M230/260		heavy trucks	yes		Algeria
SNVI	SNVI M350		heavy chassis	no		Algeria
SNVI	SNVI M120		medium truck	yes		Algeria, Mali
Taian Special Vehicle Manufactory	TA580/TAS5380		special wheeled chassis	no		China
Tata Motors	Tata LPTA 1613/2038		heavy truck	no		India
Tata Motors	Tata SD 1015		medium truck	yes		India, Sri Lanka
Tata Motors	Tata SK1613		medium truck	yes		Afghanistan
Tata Motors	Tata LPT 1615		heavy truck	yes	-present	Bangladesh
Tata Motors	Tata LPTA 3138 8x8		heavy truck	no		India
Tata Motors	Tata Novus		heavy truck	yes	2005–present	Bangladesh
Tatra	Tatra 815-7		heavy/extra heavy truck	yes	1998–present	Czech Republic, United States
Tatra	Tatra 810		medium/heavy truck (included version with armoured cab)	yes	2006–present	Czech Republic, France
Tatra	Tatra 158 Phoenix		heavy truck/tractor	yes	2011–present	Czech Republic
Tatra	Tatra 816		special chassis	no	1996–present	India
Toyota	Toyota Type 73 medium truck		middle truck	no	1973–present	Japan
UralAZ	Ural-4320		midsize/heavy truck	yes	1977–present	Russia, Iraq (pre-2003), Bulgaria, Ukraine, Hungary, Azerbaijan, Turkmenistan, Poland, North Korea, Angola, Armenia
UralAZ	Ural-5323		heavy truck/tractor	yes	1989–present	Russia
UROVESA	Uro M3		heavy truck	yes	1981–present	Spain
Vehicle Factory Jabalpur	VFJ Self-propelled Wheeled Artillery		wheeled howitzer	no		India
Vehicle Factory Jabalpur	VFJ Stallion		heavy truck, multi-role	no		India
Vehicle Factory Jabalpur	VFJ 5KL Water Bowser		heavy truck, water bowser	no		India
Vehicle Factory Jabalpur	VFJ Light Recovery Vehicle		recovery vehicle	no		India
Vehicle Factory Jabalpur	VFJ LPTA 715		medium truck, multi-role	no		India
Vehicle Factory Jabalpur	VFJ 2KL Water Bowser		medium truck, water bowser	no		India
Volvo Trucks	Volvo FM		heavy truck	yes	1998–present	Bangladesh
Volvo Trucks	Volvo FMX		heavy truck	yes	2010–present	Afghanistan
Volkswagen Truck & Bus	Volkswagen Worker		heavy truck	yes	2008–present	Brazil
Volkswagen Truck & Bus	Volkswagen Constellation		heavy truck	yes	2013–present	Brazil, Argentina
Wanshan Special Vehicle	WS2400		special wheeled chassis	no	1986–present	China
Wanshan Special Vehicle	WS2300		special wheeled chassis	no	1999–present	China, Bangladesh
Wanshan Special Vehicle	WS2500		special wheeled chassis	yes	2000–present	China
Wanshan Special Vehicle	WS51200		special wheeled chassis	no	2012–present	China
Zastava Trucks	Zastava New Turbo Rival		light truck	yes	1989–present	Serbia

== Previous models ==
"n" -"now" in column "the armies which countries now used" denotes trucks in service currently.

Company	Truck	Image	Class	Is there a civilian version	Years in Production	the armies which countries used
AEC	AEC X/Y/Z		medium trucks	no	1914-1918	United Kingdom
AEC	AEC S		medium truck	no	1916-1918	United Kingdom
AEC	AEC Marshall		medium truck	no	1935-1941	United Kingdom
AEC	AEC Matador		medium truck	no	1938-1959	United Kingdom
AEC	AEC Militant		heavy truck	no	1951-1979	United Kingdom
Albion	Albion A10		medium truck	yes	1910-1918	United Kingdom
Albion	Albion SB		light truck	yes	1923-?	United Kingdom
Albion	Albion FT-11N		medium truck	no	1940-1944	United Kingdom
Albion	Albion BY-3/BY-5		medium truck	no	1940-1945	United Kingdom
Albion	Albion CX series		heavy truck/artillery tractor/tractor-tank transporter	no	1940-1945	United Kingdom
Albion	Albion FT-15N		artillery tractor	no	1945-1946	United Kingdom
Albion	Albion FT-103N (FV-13581)		medium truck	no	1949-1950	United Kingdom
Albion	Albion WD-66N (FV-14001)/FV-14004		heavy truck	no	1955-1956	United Kingdom
Albion	Albion WD/HD/23N (FV-11101)		heavy truck	no	1954-1957	United Kingdom
Alfa Romeo	Alfa Romeo 800		medium truck	no	1939-1950	Italy
Alvis-Unipower	Alvis-Unipower M		tractor (tank transporter)	no	1994-2001	United Kingdom
AM General	M35 2½-ton cargo truck		medium truck/tractor	no	1971-1999	Argentina, Austria, Brazil, Cambodia, Canada, Chile, Taiwan, Colombia, Democratic Republic of Congo, Dominican Republic, Ecuador, Egypt, El Salvador, Greece, Honduras, Indonesia, Iraq, Israel, Lebanon, Republic of Macedonia, Mexico, Monaco, Nicaragua, Moldova, Philippines, Pakistan, Saudi Arabia, Sweden, Thailand, Tunisia, Turkey, United States (later), Venezuela, Vietnam
AM General	M54		heavy truck/tractor	no	1971	United States, Israel, Egypt, Lebanon, Philippines, Thailand, Turkey, Thailand, Argentina
AM General	M809		heavy truck/tractor	no	1971-1985	
AM General	M915/M916?M920		heavy truck/tractor	no	1978-1984	United States, Argentina (n)
AM General	M939 Truck		heavy truck	no	1982-1992	United States, Turkey, Ecuador, Egypt, Lebanon, Saudi Arabia, Taiwan, Mexico, Indonesia, Philippines, Malaysia, Iraq, Morocco, Argentina
Ariès	Ariès R5/R56		medium truck	yes	1913-1930	France
Ariès	Ariès R6/R66		medium truck	yes	1913-1930	France
Armor Holdings	FMTV		medium truck	no	2006-2007	United States (n), Thailand (n), Iraq (n), Jordan (n)
Astra	Astra BM20		heavy truck tractor-tank transporter	yes	1975-?	Italy
Astra	Astra BM300 series		heavy truck/tractor	yes	1983-199?	Italy
Austin	Austin K30		light truck	no	1939-1945	United Kingdom
Austin	Austin K2/Y		medium truck	no	1939-1945	United Kingdom, Germany (war trophy)
Austin	Austin K3		medium truck	no	1939-1945	United Kingdom, USSR
Austin	Austin K5		medium truck	no	1941-1945	United Kingdom
Austin	Austin K6		medium truck	no	1942-1945	United Kingdom, USSR
Austin	Austin K9WD		light truck	yes	1952-196?	United Kingdom
Autocar	Autocar U		medium/heavy truck/tractor	no	1941-1945	United States
Automotive Industries	AIL M325		light truck	no	1970-1993	Israel (n), Botswana (n), Chile (n), Kenya (n), Lebanon (n), Peru (n), Nicaragua (National Guard)
Automotive Industries	AIL Abir		light truck	no	1986-2014	Israel, Colombia, Peru, Guatemala, Azerbaijan (n)
BAE Systems Land & Armaments	FMTV		medium truck	no	2007-2011	United States (n), Thailand (n), Iraq (n), Jordan (n)
Bedford	Bedford MW		extra light truck	no	1939-1945	United Kingdom, USSR
Bedford	Bedford OX		light truck/tractor	no	1939-1945	United Kingdom
Bedford	Bedford OY		medium truck	no	1939-1945	United Kingdom
Bedford	Bedford QL		medium truck	no	1941-1945	United Kingdom, USSR
Bedford	Bedford RL		medium truck	yes	1951-1970	United Kingdom, Denmark, New Zealand
Bedford	Bedford MK		medium truck	yes	1971-1987	United Kingdom
Bedford	Bedford TM4-4		heavy tractor	yes	1981-1992	United Kingdom
Marshall	Bedford MT		medium/heavy truck/tractor	yes	1992-2002	United Kingdom
Berliet	Berliet M		medium truck	yes	1909-1913	France
Berliet	Berliet CAD		medium truck	yes	1912-1913	France
Berliet	Berliet CBA		medium truck	yes	1911-1932	France, Russian Empire
Berliet	Berliet AH5		light truck for searchlights	yes	1917	France
Berna	Berna 2VM		medium truck	yes	1964-1976	Switzerland
Bianchi	Bianchi Mediolanum-36		medium truck	no	1936-1938	Italy (part in Ethiopia)
Bianchi	Bianchi Mediolanum-38		medium truck	no	1938-?	Italy
Bianchi	Bianchi Miles		medium truck	no	1939-1944	Italy
Bianchi	Bianchi Audax		medium truck	yes	1950-?	Italy
Bianchi	Bianchi CL51		medium truck	yes	1951-?	Italy
Bianchi	Bianchi CM51		medium truck	yes	1951-?	Italy
Bianchi	Bianchi CM54		medium truck	no	1954-1957	Italy
BMC	BMC Fatih		medium/heavy truck	yes	1983-200?	Turkey
BMC	BMC Profesyonel		heavy truck	yes	1998-2013	Turkey
BMC	BMC 235-16P 4x4 TWV		medium truck	no		Turkey
BMY	M939 Truck		heavy truck	no	1987-1992	United States, Turkey, Ecuador, Egypt, Lebanon, Saudi Arabia, Taiwan, Mexico, Indonesia, Philippines, Malaysia, Iraq, Morocco, Argentina
Boeing (with Paccar)	HML		tractor with armoured cab for towing launch complexes ballistic missiles MGM-134 Midgetman	no	1985-1992	United States
Bombardier	M35CDN		medium truck	no	1981–present	Canada
Borgward	Borgward B 3000		medium truck	yes	1938-1944	Germany
Borgward	Borgward B 2000 A/O		extra light truck	yes	1955-1961	West Germany
Borgward	Borgward B2500A		light truck	yes	1955-1957	West Germany
Bravia	Bravia Gazela		light truck	no	the end of the 1970s-?	Portugal
Bravia	Bravia Leopardo-III		medium truck	no	the end of the 1970s-?	Portugal
Bravia	Bravia Pantera		heavy truck	no	the end of the 1970s-?	Portugal
Bremach	Bremach GR		light truck	no	1983-2001	Italy
Brimont	Brimont ETR-206		heavy truck	yes	1979-1993	France
Brimont	Brimont Brutt		light airtransportable truck	no	1980s	France (Air Force)
Brockway	Brockway B666		heavy truck	no	1942-1945	United States
Brockway	Brockway C666		crane chassis	no	1943-1945	United States
Brossel	Brossel-TAL		artillery tractor	no	1937-1939	Belgium
Bryansky Avtomobilny Zavod	ZIL-135LM		special wheeled chassis for artillery rocket system 9K52 Luna-M	no	1959-1994	USSR, Russia (n, in storage), Afghanistan (n), Belarus (n), Cuba (n), Egypt (n), Libya (n), North Korea (n), Syria (n), Ukraine (n), Yemen (n), Bulgaria, Czechoslovakia, East Germany, Iraq, Kuwait, Poland, Romania, South Yemen, Yugoslavia
Bryansky Avtomobilny Zavod	BAZ-135MB		special wheeled chassis for middle-range guided missile system Redut, launcher of drones Tu-143 and Tu-243	no	1965-1996	USSR, North Korea (n), Russia (n), Ukraine (n), Bulgaria, Czechoslovakia, Czech Republic, Iraq, Romania, Slovakia, Syria
Bryansky Avtomobilny Zavod	BAZ-6953		extra heavy truck/ballast tractor	yes	1988-?	USSR, Russia
Bucher-Guyer	Bucher Duro		medium truck	no	1994-2003	Switzerland, Germany, Venezuela, United Kingdom, Ireland, Denmark
Büssing	Büssing I/II/III/IV		medium truck	yes	191?-1918	Germany
Bussing			artillery tractor	no	1914-1918	Germany
Bussing	Bussing-NAG G31		light truck	no	1931-1935	Germany
Bussing	Bussing-NAG 3GL6		medium truck	yes	1931-?	Germany
Bussing	Bussing-NAG 500S/500A/4500S/4500A		medium truck	no	1940-1945	Germany
Bussing	sWS		medium semi-tracked artillery tractor	no	1943-1945	Germany
Caterpillar	M520 Goer		heavy articulated multi-purpose floating air transportable transporter	no	1963-1976	United States
Caterpillar	XM554		extra heavy articulated floating air transportable recovery vehicle/chassis for long-range air defense missile system Nike-Hercules Missile	no	1963-1976	United States
Citroën	Citroën Type 32		medium truck	yes	1934-1948	France, Germany
Citroën	Citroën Type 45		heavy truck	yes	1933-1953	France, Germany
Citroën	Citroën FOM		medium truck	no	1962-1964	France
Chevrolet	Chevrolet Master Trado		artillery tractor	no	1937-1939	West Europa
Chevrolet	Chevrolet G506		light truck/tractor	no	1940-1945	United States, United Kingdom, USSR
Chevrolet	CMP		extra light/light truck	no	1940-1945	Canada, Australia, Egypt, New Zealand, India
Chevrolet	CUCV		light truck (pickup)	yes	1983-2000	United States, Canada, Estonia, Latvia, Lebanon, Lithuania, Ecuador, Saudi Arabia, Sweden, United Kingdom, Venezuela
Coleman	Coleman C25		light truck	no	1926-1930	United States
Coleman	Coleman T1		heavy truck	no	1926-1930	United States
Coleman	Coleman FBD		heavy truck	yes	1930-?	United States
Coleman	Coleman DW6		medium truck	yes	1930-?	United States
Coleman	Coleman CF-55AF		tractor for towing bombers Convair B-36 Peacemaker and LGM-30 Minuteman ballistic missiles	no	early 1950s	United States
Commer	Commer RC		medium truck	yes	1910s	United Kingdom
Commer	Commer Beetle		extra light truck	no	1935-1939	United Kingdom
Corbitt	Corbitt F		heavy truck	yes	1933-?	United States
Corbitt	Corbitt 50SD6		heavy truck	no	1940-1945	United States
Corbitt	Corbitt 54SD6		heavy wrecker	yes		United States
Corbitt	Corbitt 40SD6		tractor	yes		United States
Crossley Motors	Crossley FWD		truck	no	1940-1945	United Kingdom
Csepel	Csepel B300		truck	no	1952-1954	Hungary
Csepel	Csepel D344		medium truck	no	1961-1972	Hungary
Csepel	Csepel D566		heavy truck	no	1971-1989	Hungary
DAC	DAC 660 series/FAEG/FA/HAE		heavy truck	no	1974–present	Romania
DAF	DAF YA-328		medium truck	no	1952-1963	Netherlands
DAF	DAF YA-314		medium truck	no	1955-1965	Netherlands
DAF	DAF YT-1500L/YA-514		tractor	no	1955-1965	Netherlands
DAF	DAF YA-616/YT-616		heavy truck	no	1957-1968	Netherlands
DAF	DAF YA-4440		medium truck	no	1976-1985	Netherlands
DAF	DAF YA-5441		heavy truck	no	1976-1985	Netherlands
DAF	DAF YA-4442/5442		heavy truck	no	1985-200?	Netherlands
DAF	DAF YAV-2300/YTV/YPR		heavy truck/tractor	yes	1985-200?	Netherlands
DAF	DAF YAZ-2300/YKZ/YBZ		heavy truck	no	1982-200?	Netherlands
DAF	DAF YTZ		tractor-tank transporter	no	1982-?	Netherlands
De Dion-Bouton	De Dion-Bouton Type BY		medium truck	yes	1909-1914	France
De Dion-Bouton	De Dion-Bouton Type DV		medium truck	yes	1912-1914	France
Delahaye	Delahaye Type 59		medium truck	yes	1913-1920	France
Delahaye	Delahaye Type 60		medium truck	yes	1913-1917	France
Delahaye	Delahaye Type 61		medium truck	no	1914	France
Delahaye	Delahaye Type 62		medium truck	yes	1913-1914	France
Delahaye	Delahaye Type 63		medium truck	yes	1913-1914	France
Delahaye	Delahaye Type 65		heavy truck	yes	1913-1914	France
Delahaye	Delahaye Type 83		light truck	yes	1921-1933	France
Delahaye	Delahaye Type 85		heavy truck	yes	1920-1926	France
Delahaye	Delahaye Type 89		medium truck	yes	1925-1936	France
Delahaye	Delahaye Type 95		heavy truck	yes	1925-1936	France
Delahaye	Delahaye Type 103		medium truck	yes	1931-1941	France, Germany
Delahaye	Delahaye Type 131		heavy truck	yes	1935-1940	France
Delahaye	Delahaye Type 140		light truck	yes	1935-1941	France, Germany
Dodge	Dodge T202 VC3/VC4/VC5		light truck	no	1939-1940	United States
Dodge	Dodge WC series		light/medium truck	no	1940-1945	United States, USSR, Canada, Australia, Austria, Belgium, Brazil, Greece, Iran, Norway, Portugal, United Kingdom (Army Medical Corps)
Dodge	Dodge M37		medium truck	no	1949-1970	United States
Dodge	CUCV		light truck		1975-1978	United States, Canada, Lebanon
Ernesto Breda	Breda 32		truck-artillery tractor	no	1932-1940	Italy
Ernesto Breda	Breda 33		truck-artillery tractor	no	1933-1940	Italy
Ernesto Breda	Breda 40		truck-artillery tractor	no	1941-1944	Italy
Ernesto Breda	Breda 41		truck	no	1941-1944	Italy
Ernesto Breda	Breda-Dovunque-41		heavy truck/tractor	no	1941-1944	Italy
Ernesto Breda	Breda-130		tractor	no	later 1940-s-?	Italy
Ernesto Breda	Breda-Dovunque-52		heavy truck	no	1953-1957	Italy
Ernst Grube	Ernst Grube G5		heavy truck	no	1955-1964	East Germany
Fabrika automobila Priboj	FAP 13		heavy truck	yes	1953-197?	Yugoslavia, Serbia (n)
Faun	Faun L900		heavy truck	yes	1937-1940	Germany
Faun	Faun ZR		ballast tractor	no	1940-1944	Germany
Faun	Faun ZRS		ballast tractor with combined combined course	no	1940-1944	Germany
Faun	Faun L908/45A		heavy truck	no	1957-1971	West Germany
Faun	Faun L908/425A/L908SA		heavy truck/tractor	no	1957-1971	West Germany
Faun	Faun L908/54A		heavy truck	no	1960-1971	West Germany
Faun	Faun L912 (L912/45A, L912SA, L912/5050AK)		heavy truck/tractor	no	1958-1970	West Germany
Faun	Faun L912VSA		tractor-tank transporter	no	1957	West Germany
Faun	Faun L912/Z912 (L912/21)		heavy truck/tractor	no	1958-1969	West Germany
Faun	Faun L1212		heavy chassis/tractor	no	1959-1966	West Germany
Faun	Faun GT6, GT8, Z12		heavy chassis	no	1957-1961	West Germany
Faun	SLT 50 Elefant		tractor-tank transporter	no	1977-1979	West Germany, Germany (n), Poland (n)
Faun	SLT 56 Franziska		tractor-tank transporter	no	1981-1988	West Germany
Federal	Federal AS		medium truck	no	1918	United States (Air Force)
Federal	Federal Q9		medium truck	no	1933-?	United States
Federal	Federal 75K131		medium truck	no	1939-?	United States (of the United States Coast Guard)
Federal	Federal 94X43		tractor	no	1941-1945	United States
Federal	Federal 604		tractor-tank transporter	no	1941-1945	United States
Federal	Federal 606		heavy wrecker	no	1941-1945	United States (Air Force)
Federal	Federal 605		tractor	no	1941-1945	United States
Federal	Federal 2G		medium dump	no	1943-1944	United States (unit repair networks)
Fiat	Fiat 15Ter		light truck	yes	1911-1922	Italy, Russian Empire
Fiat	Fiat 18BL/18BLR		medium truck	no	1914-?	Italy
Fiat	Fiat 20BL		artillery tractor	no	1915-1918	Italy
Fiat	Fiat 30BL	artillery tractor	no	1915-1918	Italy	
Fiat	Fiat 621RN		medium truck	yes	1930-?	Italy
Fiat	Fiat 633NM/633BM		heavy truck	no	1932-1938	Italy
Fiat	FIAT 634NM		heavy truck	yes	1933-1939	Italy
Fiat	Fiat 626NM/626BL		medium truck	yes	1939-1950	Italy
Fiat	Fiat 625NM		medium truck	no	1939-1950	Italy
Fiat	Fiat 666NM/666N7		heavy truck	no	1937-1948	Italy
Fiat	Fiat 665NM		heavy truck	no	1942-1944	Italy
Fiat	Fiat SC727		artillery semi-tracked tractor	no	1942-1944	Italy
Fiat	Fiat 680NM		heavy truck	no	1948-?	Italy
Fiat	Fiat 697		heavy truck	yes	1970–1996	Argentina (n)
Fiat	Fiat 639NM		medium truck	yes	1951-?	Italy
Fiat	Fiat 6601 (CM52)		medium truck	no	1952-?	Italy, Libya, Mexico, Venezuela
Fiat	Fiat TM48		medium artillery tractor	no	1948-?	Italy
Fiat	Fiat TP50		heavy artillery tractor	no	1948-?	Italy
Fiat	Fiat Dovunque-50		heavy truck	no	1950-1953	Italy
Fiat	Fiat-6602 (CP70)		medium truck	no	1970-?	Italy
Fiat	Fiat-6607 (CP70)		heavy truck	no	1970-?	Italy
Fiat	Fiat 6607CM		heavy truck	no	1973-?	Italy
Fiat	Fiat 6605		heavy truck/tractor	no	1971-?	Italy
FN Herstal	FN-Kégresse		semi-tracked artillery tractor	no	1934-1940	Belgium
FN Herstal	FN 63C/63C		heavy truck/tractor	no	1936-1940	Belgium
FN Herstal	FN 62C		medium truck	no	1949-1950	Belgium
FN Herstal	FN-Brossel-Miesse 62C4RM		medium truck	no	1952-1959	Belgium
FWD	FWD B		medium truck	no	1912-1937	United States, France, United Kingdom
FWD	FWD 6x6		artillery tractor	no	1927-1931	United Kingdom
FWD	FWD HH6		medium truck	no	1930-?	United States
FWD	FWD M7		heavy truck	no	1930-?	United States
FWD	FWD HAR-01/HAR-03		medium truck/tractor	yes	1941-1942	Canada, United Kingdom
FWD	FWD HAR-1		medium truck	no	1943-1944	United States, United Kingdom
FWD	FWD SU		heavy truck	no	1943-1945	United States, United Kingdom
FWD	FWD YU		heavy truck	yes	1941-1942	United States
FWD	FWD Tractioneer		heavy truck	yes	1970-1980s	
FWD	FWD RB662158 66TT50/66TT60		tractor-tank transporter	no	mid-1980s	United States
GAZ	GAZ MM of war time		light truck	yes	1941-1944	USSR
GAZ	GAZ-61-417		extra light truck (pickup-artillery tractor)	yes	1941-1942	USSR
GAZ	GAZ-63		medium truck/tractor	yes	1947-1968	USSR
GAZ	GAZ-62		light truck	no	1959-1962	USSR
GAZ	GAZ-66		medium truck	no	1964-1999	USSR, East Germany, Russia, Uzbekistan (n), Georgia, Ukraine (n), Tajikistan (n), Armenia (n)
GAZ	GAZ-66B		airborne medium truck	no	1966-1999	USSR
GAZ	GAZ-33097		medium truck	yes		Armenia (n)
GMC	GMC T4		artillery tractor	no	early 1930s	United States
GMC	GMC T1		semi-tracked artillery tractor	no	1933-1934	United States
GMC	GMC T5		semi-tracked artillery tractor	no	1935-?	United States
GMC	GMC 4272/4930		light truck	no	1936-1940	United States
GMC	GMC 4929 (T16)		medium truck	no	1938-1940	United States
GMC	GMC ACKX		medium truck	yes	1939-1942	United States
GMC	GMC CMP		light truck	no	1939-1945	Canada, Australia, Egypt, New Zealand, India
GMC	GMC AFKWX		medium/heavy truck	yes	1939-?	United States
GMC	GMC CCKW		medium truck	no	1941-1945	Austria, United States, United Kingdom
GMC	M135		medium truck/tractor	no	1952-1957	United States
GMC	GMC A/S32A-20		tractor for transporting intercontinental ballistic missiles Minutmen	no	1965	United States
GMC	GMC-MAN M1001/M1002/M1013/M1014		heavy tractor/truck	no	1981-1986	United States
GMC	CUCV		light truck (pickup)	yes	1983–1986, 1996–present	United States
Hanomag	Hanomag SS100W		tractor	yes	1936-1944	Germany
Hanomag	Sd.Kfz. 11		semi-tracked artillery tractor/truck	no	1938-1945	Germany
Hanomag	Hanomag AL28		light truck	yes	1953-1973	West Germany, NATO
Hanomag-Henschel	Hanomag-Henschel AL28		light truck	yes	1969-1973	West Germany, Switzerland
Hanomag-Henschel	Hanomag-Henschel HS 22		heavy truck	no	1969-1973	West Germany
Henschel	Henschel 33D1/33G1		heavy truck	no	1933-1942	Germany
Henschel	Henschel HS 115A		heavy truck	no	1956-1958	West Germany
Henschel	Henschel HS 3-160A		extra heavy truck	no	1959-1973	West Germany
Henschel	Henschel HS 22		heavy truck	no	1960-1973	West Germany
Indiana	Indiana 19DR		medium truck	no	1933-?	United States
Indiana	Indiana 16x6		medium truck-artillery tractor	no	1934-1936	United States
Indiana	Indiana 20x6		heavy truck-artillery tractor	no	1934-1936	United States
Industriewerke Ludwigsfelde	IFA W50LA/A		medium truck	yes	1967-1990	East Germany, Iraq
Industriewerke Ludwigsfelde	IFA L60		heavy truck	no	1986-1990	East Germany
International Harvester	International K		light/medium/heavy truck/tractor	yes	1940-1947	United States, USSR
International Harvester	International M-1-4/M-2-4		light truck (pickup)	no	1940-1945	United States
International Harvester	International M-3-4		light truck	no	1941-1944	United States (Navy)
International Harvester	International M-5H-6		medium truck/tractor	no	1941-1945	United States (mainly Navy), USSR, China
International Harvester	International H-542		tractor	no	1944-1945	United States (branches in France)
International Harvester	M54		heavy truck	no	1951-mid 1960s	United States, Israel, Egypt, Lebanon, Philippines, Thailand, Turkey, Thailand, Argentina
International Harvester	International Mk-III/Mk-IV		medium truck	no	1960-1974	Australia
International Harvester	International Mk-V		heavy truck	no	1966-1974	Australia
Isotta Fraschini	Isotta Fraschini GM3		medium truck	yes	1914-1918	Italy
Isotta Fraschini	Isotta Fraschini 16/16A		medium truck	yes	1915-1918	Italy
Isotta Fraschini	Isotta Fraschini D80NM		heavy truck	yes	1935-1939	Italy
Isotta Fraschini	Isotta Fraschini D70NM		medium truck	yes	1936-1939	Italy
Isotta Fraschini	Isotta Fraschini D65UMB		medium truck	yes	1939-1942	Italy
Isotta Fraschini	Isotta Fraschini D80COM		heavy truck	yes	1939-1947	Italy
Isuzu	Type 94 (M2594)		light truck	no	1934-?	Japan
Isuzu	Isuzu TX		medium truck	yes	1933-?	Japan
Isuzu	Isuzu TU23		medium truck	no	1937-?	Japan
Isuzu	Isuzu TB60		heavy truck	no	1937-?	Japan
Isuzu	Isuzu TW340		medium truck	no	1957-?	Japan
Isuzu	Isuzu TWD20/25		medium truck	no	1960s-?	Japan
Isuzu	Isuzu TSD45/TSD55		medium truck	no	kater 1970s-?	Japan (n), Bangladesh (n)
Jelcz	Jelcz 315TW		heavy truck	yes	1968-2001	Poland
Jelcz	Jelcz P662D34		heavy truck	yes	later 1990s-2004	Poland
Jiefang (FAW)	Jiefang CA-30		medium truck	no	1958-1986	China
Kaelble	Kaelble Z6WA		airfield tractor	yes	1936-1937	Germany
Kaelble	Kaelble Z8V2A		ballast tractor	no	1938-1939	Germany
Kaelble	Kaelble KDV833S/KDV832S	tractor	yes	1950s	West Germany	
Kaiser Jeep	M35		medium truck/tractor	no	1964-1971	Argentina, Austria, Brazil, Cambodia, Canada, Chile, Taiwan, Colombia, Democratic Republic of Congo, Dominican Republic, Ecuador, Egypt, El Salvador, Greece, Honduras, Indonesia, Iraq, Israel, Lebanon, Republic of Macedonia, Mexico, Monaco, Nicaragua, Moldova, Philippines, Pakistan, Saudi Arabia, Sweden, Thailand, Tunisia, Turkey, United States (later), Venezuela, Vietnam
Kaiser Jeep	M54		heavy truck/tractor	no	1964-1971	United States, Israel, Egypt, Lebanon, Philippines, Thailand, Turkey, Thailand, Argentina
Kaiser Jeep	M715		light truck	no	1967-1969	United States
KAMAZ	KamAZ-4310 and KamAZ-43101		heavy truck	yes	1981-1996	USSR, Russia, Ukraine(n), Kazakhstan, Armenia (n)
KAMAZ	KamAZ-4410		tractor	yes	1981-1996	USSR, Russia
Karrier	Karrier CK6		medium truck	no	1939-?	United Kingdom
Karrier	Karrier K6/KT4		medium truck	no	1940-1945	United Kingdom
Kenworth	Kenworth-570/571/572		heavy wrecker	no	1941-1943	United States
Kenworth	Kenworth-572 (M1A1)		heavy wrecker	no	1943-1945	United States
Kenworth	Kenworth T10		tractor with two control stations for transportation tanks or 280-mm howitzer M65 Atomic Cannon	no	1952-1953	United States
KrAZ	KrAZ-214		heavy truck	no	1957-1967	USSR
KrAZ	KrAZ-255B		heavy truck/tractor	no	1967-1994	USSR, East Germany, Serbia, Bulgaria, Poland
KrAZ	KrAZ-260		heavy truck/tractor	no	1979-1993	USSR, Russia, Ukraine (n)
Krupp	Krupp-Daimler		chassis for anti-aircraft	no	1910-1918	Germany
Krupp	Krupp L2H43		light truck-artillery tractor	no	1934-?	Germany
Krupp	Krupp L2H143		light truck/artillery tractor	no	1937-1942	Germany
Krupp	Krupp L3H63/L3H63		medium truck	no	1931-1938	Germany
Krupp	Krupp Drache AL8 DR4		heavy truck	no	1955-?	West Germany, United States (branches in West Germany)
Krupp	Krupp L3H63/L3H63		medium truck	no	1931-1938	Germany
Laffly	Laffly LC2		light truck	yes	1929-1935	France
KZKT	KZKT-7428		tractor-tank transporter	no	1990-2011	Russia
Lancia	Lancia Zeta		light truck	no	1911-?	Italy (branches in Libya)
Lancia	Lancia 1Z		medium truck	no	1913-?	Italy
Lancia	Lancia Ro-264NM		medium truck	yes	1935-1938	Italy
Lancia	Lancia 3 RO		heavy truck	no	1938-1948	Italy
Lancia	Lancia 6ROM (CP48)		heavy truck	no	1948-1958	Italy
Lancia	Lancia CL51		light truck	no	1952-1970	Italy
Lancia	Lancia TL51		artillery tractor	no	1952-1970	Italy
Lancia	Lancia 506		heavy truck	no	1959-1968	Italy
Lancia	Lancia 209.400		medium truck	no	1973-1978	Italy
Land Rover	Land Rover 101 Forward Control		light truck	no	1972-1978	United Kingdom, Australia
Latil	Latil TH		artillery tractor	no	1913-191?	France
Latil	Latil TP		artillery tractor	yes	1914-?	France
Latil	Latil TAR		artillery tractor	yes	1913-1932	France
Latil	Latil TL		artillery tractor	yes	1924–1929 (including the civilian version)	France
Latil	Latil KTL		artillery tractor	yes	1934–1935 (military version)	France
Latil	Latil TAR H2		artillery tractor	no	1932-1939	France
Latil	Latil M2 TL6		light/medium truck/tractor	yes	1934-	France
Latil	Latil M2 TZ		artillery tractor	no	1935-?	France
Latil	Latil M18 T2		light truck	no	1955	France
LeTourneau (now part of Cameron International)	LeTourneau Tournetractor		single axle tractor	no	1943-1953	United States
LeTourneau	LeTourneau-Westinghouse Sno-Buggy TC-264		extra heavy tractor	no	1954	United States (military base in Antarctica)
LeTourneau	LeTourneau-Westinghouse M1/M2		single axle tractor to tow the launcher rocket system Corporal	no	1953-1955	NATO
LeTourneau	LeTourneau snow train		active multiple train	no	1954-1957	United States
LIAZ	LIAZ 111.154		heavy truck	yes	early 1980s-1987	Czechoslovakia
LIAZ	LIAZ 151.154		heavy truck	yes	1987-early 1990s	Czechoslovakia, Czech Republic
LIAZ	LIAZ 18.33PVA		heavy truck	yes	early 1990s-1995	Czechoslovakia, Czech Republic
Liberty (production of Diamond T, Selden, Pierce-Arrow, Sterling, Velie, Packard, Garford Company, Brockway Motor, Gramm-Bernstein, Republic, Bethlehem)	Liberty truck		medium truck	no	1917-1919	United States
Mack	Mack AC		heavy truck/tractor	yes	1917-1929	United States, France
Mack	Mack T12		tractor	yes	1932-?	United States
Mack	Mack EN5779		heavy truck	yes	1942-1943	United States
Mack	Mack LMSW		heavy truck	no	1940-1945	United States
Mack	Mack NJU1/NJU2		tractor	no	1941-1942	United States
Mack	Mack NM		heavy truck	no	1939-1945	United States
Mack	Mack NO		artillery tractor	no	1939-1945	United States
Mack	Mack NR		heavy truck	no	1940-1945	United States, USSR
Mack	M54		heavy truck	no	1951-1964	United States, Israel, Egypt, Lebanon, Philippines, Thailand, Turkey, Cambodia, Argentina
Mack	M123		heavy truck	no	1953-1968	United States
Mack	Mack DM6116S/DM492S		heavy tractor/chassis	yes	1968-?	United States
Mack	Mack RM6866RS		heavy truck	yes	1980-?	United States, Australia
Mack	Mack RD8266SX		tractor-tank transporter	yes	early 1980s-?	United States
Mack	Mack CL713		tractor-tank transporter	yes	1990s-?	United States (n)
Magirus Deutz	Magirus 70PS		artillery tractor	no	1918	Germany
Magirus Deutz	Magirus ML		medium truck	no	mid-1920s-?	Germany
Magirus Deutz	Magirus M206		light truck	no	1934-1937	Germany
Magirus Deutz	Magirus 33G1/33H		medium truck	no	1938-1944	Germany
Magirus Deutz	Magirus Deutz A6500		heavy truck	yes	1951-1960	West Germany
Magirus Deutz	Magirus Deutz Jupiter-150/Jupiter 178D15SA		heavy truck/tractor/artillery tractor	no	1959-1967	West Germany
Magirus Deutz	Magirus Deutz Uranus		artillery tractor	yes	1956-?	West Germany
MAN	MAN F1H6		heavy truck	yes	1935-?	Germany
MAN	MAN F4		heavy truck	yes	1938-?	Germany
MAN	MAN ML4500A		medium truck	no	1940-1944	Germany
MAN	MAN 630L2A		heavy truck	no	1959-1972	West Germany
MAN	MAN 670L3AE		heavy truck	no	1959-1960	West Germany
MAN	MAN 415HA		medium truck	yes	1958-1972	West Germany
MAN	MAN 11.136HA		heavy truck	yes	1958-?	West Germany, UN
MAN	MAN-Volkswagen 8.136FAE		medium truck	yes		West Germany, Denmark (n)
MAN	MAN 14.240FAEG		heavy truck	yes		West Germany
MAN	MAN 20.280DFAEG		heavy truck	yes		West Germany
MAN	MAN DFAT		tractor-tank transporter	yes		West Germany
MAN	MAN KAT1		heavy truck/tractor	no	1976-1986	West Germany, United States, Belgium, Austria (n)
MAN	MAN LX/FX		heavy truck/tractor	no	1986-2004	West Germany, Germany (n), Spain (n), Turkey (n)
Mercedes-Benz	Mercedes-Benz SK		heavy truck	yes	1989-1998	Bangladesh (n)
Mercedes-Benz	Mercedes-Benz G3a		light truck	no	1930-1936	Germany
Mercedes-Benz	Mercedes-Benz 1117		medium truck	yes	1993-	Bangladesh (n)
Mercedes-Benz	Mercedes-Benz L1500E/S/A		light truck	yes	1937-1944	Germany
Mercedes-Benz	Mercedes-Benz L3000S/A		medium truck	yes		Germany
Mercedes-Benz	Mercedes-Benz L4500A/S		medium truck	yes		Germany
Mercedes-Benz	Mercedes-Benz L6500		heavy truck	yes		Germany
Mercedes-Benz	Mercedes-Benz L701		light car	no	1943–1944, 1945-194?	Germany
Mercedes-Benz	Unimog 404 S		light truck	yes	1956-1972	West Germany
Mercedes-Benz	Mercedes-Benz LG315/46		heavy truck	no	1956-1964	West Germany
Mercedes-Benz	Unimog 413 (U80)		light truck	yes	1965-1987	West Germany
Mercedes-Benz	Unimog 416 (U80/100)		light truck/multipurpose vehicle	yes	1963-1988	West Germany
Mercedes-Benz	Unimog 435 (U1300L/U1700L)		medium truck	yes	1975–1993	Australia (n)
Mercedes-Benz	Mercedes-Benz L1017		medium truck	yes	1977-1987	West Germany
Mercedes-Benz	Mercedes-Benz 3850AS		tractor-tank transporter	yes		West Germany
Mercedes-Benz	Mercedes-Benz 2628A		heavy truck	yes		West Germany
Mercedes-Benz	Unimog U1350L		medium truck	yes		Germany (n)
Mercedes-Benz	Unimog U1550L		medium truck	yes		Germany (n)
Mercedes-Benz	Unimog U2150L		medium truck	yes		Germany (n)
Mercedes-Benz	Unimog U2450		heavy chassis	yes	1993-?	Germany (n)
Mercedes-Benz/Rába	Mercedes-Benz S		heavy truck	no	2004-2008	NATO, Hungary
Minsk Automobile Plant	ru:МАЗ-502		medium truck/tractor	yes	1957-1966	USSR
Minsk Automobile Plant	MAZ-535		heavy tractor with a loading platform/tractor	no	1958-1964	USSR
Minsk Automobile Plant	MAZ-537		heavy ballast tractor/tractor-tank transporter	no	1959-1989	USSR, Ukraine, Hungary (n), Russia, Serbia (n)
Minsk Automobile Plant	MAZ-543/MAZ-7310/MAZ-7410		extra heavy special wheeled chassis for missile launchers TR-1 Temp, R-17 Elbrus, multiple launch rocket system BM-30 Smerch/ /chassis for airfield fire truck АА-60(543)-160/ /tractor (MAZ-7410; used as part of a tanker TZ-80, tank transporter, towing radar detection antenna station anti-aircraft missile system S-300PS / PM)/ /ballast tractor	no	1962-mid 2000s (production was not formally terminated)	USSR, Belarus, Bulgaria, Hungary, East Germany, Poland, Romania, Ukraine, Czechoslovakia, Russia (n), Kazakhstan (n), Armenia (n), Syria (n), Egypt (n), Iran (n), Libya (n), UAE (n), Yemen (n), Turkmenistan (n)(, North Korea (n), Vietnam (n), Afghanistan (n), Azerbaijan (n)
Minsk Automobile Plant	MAZ-547/MAZ-7916		special wheeled chassis for launchers missile system RT-21 Temp 2S, RSD-10 Pioneer	no	1972-1988	USSR, North Korea (n, used as launcher missile system Musudan)
Minsk Automobile Plant	MAZ-7912/7917		special wheeled chassis for launcher missile system RT-2PM Topol	no	1977-mid 1990s	USSR, Russia (n)
Mitsubishi	Type 93 (M-2593)		light truck	no	1935-?	Japan
Mitsubishi	Mitsubishi W23/W121/W200		heavy truck	no	mid 1950s-mid 1970s	Japan
Mol	Mol T5266.05F		tractor-tank transporter	yes	1978-end of 1980s	Belgium
Mol	Mol T6066		tractor-tank transporter	no	1989-?	Asian and African countries
Moreland	Moreland TX6		heavy truck	yes	end of 1920s-1938	United States, USSR
Morris Motors	Tilly		pickup	no	1940-1945	United Kingdom
Morris Commercial	Morris CD/CDSW		light truck/artillery tractor	no	1935-1942	United Kingdom
Morris Commercial	Morris CS8		extra light truck	no	1934-1944	United Kingdom
Morris Commercial	Morris PU		extra light truck	no	1935-1942	United Kingdom
Morris Commercial	Morris C4		extra light truck	no		United Kingdom
Morris Commercial	Morris CS11/30		extra light truck	no	1935-1939	United Kingdom
Morris Commercial	Morris C8GS		extra light truck	no	1939-1945	United Kingdom
Morris Commercial	Morris Commercial MRA1 (FV-16101)		light truck	no	195?-1956	United Kingdom
MZKT	MZKT-74135		tractor-tank transporter	no	2004-?	UAE (n)
ÖAF	ÖAF SLKW		heavy truck	no	1974–	Austria (n)
Officine Meccaniche	OM-32		extra light truck	no	1932-194?	Italy, Erythrea (occupied)
Officine Meccaniche	OM Taurus N/B/C		medium truck	no	1939-1950	Italy, Libya (colony)
Officine Meccaniche	OM CL51		light truck	yes	1951-?	Italy
Officine Meccaniche	OM-6600 (CP56)		heavy truck	no	1956-1965	Italy
Pacific Car and Foundry	M26		tractor-tank transporter with armoured cab	no	1943-1945	United States, United Kingdom
Pacific Car and Foundry	M26A1		tractor-tank transporter	no	1943-1945	United States, United Kingdom
Panhard	Panhard K		light truck	yes	1903-1911	France
Panhard	Panhard K6		light truck	yes	1911-1915	France
Panhard	Panhard K13		artillery tractor	no	1913-1918	France
Panhard	Panhard K14		light truck	yes	1915-1921	France
Panhard	Panhard K34		heavy truck	yes	1928-1935	France
Panhard	Panhard K 101		medium truck	yes	1937-1940	France
Panhard	Panhard K112		heavy truck	yes	1938 (Note: Years of military production)	France (North African colonials)
Panhard	Panhard K113		heavy truck	no	1939-1940	France (North African colonials)
Panhard	Panhard K125		heavy truck	no	1937-1940	France
Pegaso	Pegaso 3045		medium truck	no	1970-1980	Spain
Pegaso	Pegaso 3050		heavy truck	no	1970-1980	Spain
Pegaso	Pegaso 3046/7222		medium truck	no	1980-1992	Spain (n)
Pegaso	Pegaso 3055/7227		heavy truck	no	1982-1992	Spain (n)
Peugeot	Peugeot Type 504		medium truck	yes	1913-1914	France
Peugeot	Peugeot Type 505		medium truck	yes	1913-1914	France
Peugeot	Peugeot Type 506		heavy truck	yes	1913-1914	France
Peugeot	Peugeot Type 507		heavy truck	yes	1913-1914	France
Peugeot	Peugeot Type 1504		medium truck	yes	1914-1916	France
Peugeot	Peugeot Type 1515		medium truck	yes	1915-1916	France
Peugeot	Peugeot Type 1524		medium truck	yes	1916-1920	France
Peugeot	Peugeot Type 1525		medium truck	yes	1917-1920	France
Perez et Raymond	Perez et Raymond Tidelium T40		tank transporter	no	1970-1978	France
Praga	Praga V		heavy truck	no	1911-1920	Austro-Hungary, Czechoslovakia
Praga	Praga RN		medium truck	yes	1934-1953	Czechoslovakia, Germany
Praga	Praga RV		medium truck	no	1935-1939	Czechoslovakia, Germany
Praga	Praga V3S		medium truck	no	1953-198?	Czechoslovakia
Rába	Raba Botond-38M (Botond-I)		light truck-tractor	no	1938-1943	Hungary
Raba/MÁVAG	Raba Maros		artillery tractor	no	1939-1944	Hungary
Raba	Raba Botond M41 (Botond-II)		light truck-tractor	no	1943–1944, 1947-1948	Hungary
Raba	Raba T series		heavy truck	yes	1980s-2002, 2005-	Hungary
Raba	Raba H		heavy truck	no	1999-2000	Hungary
Renault	Renault DA		medium truck	yes	1912-1915	France, Russian Empire
Renault	Renault DB		medium truck	yes	1912-1915	France, Russian Empire
Renault	Renault DN		medium truck	yes	1913-1914	France
Renault	Renault DV		heavy truck	yes	1913-1914	France
Renault	Renault EG		medium artillery tractor	no	1914-1920s	France
Renault	Renault EM		medium truck	no	1914	France
Renault	Renault EP		medium truck	no	1914-1918	France, Russian Empire
Renault	Renault EX		medium truck	no	1914-1915	France
Renault	Renault FF		medium truck	no	19114-1915	France, Russian Empire
Renault	Renault FN		medium truck	no	1915-1917	France
Renault	Renault FU		heavy truck-tank transporter	yes	1917-1923	France
Renault	Renault FV		heavy half-track truck	no	1917-1918	France
Renault	Renault GZ		medium truck	yes	1920-1922	France
Renault	Renault LP		medium truck	yes	1923-1925	France
Renault	Renault Type MH		light truck	yes	1924-1927	
Renault	Renault MM		medium truck	yes	1925	France
Renault	Renault MR		heavy truck-tank transporter	yes	1925-1929	France
Renault	Renault MV		medium truck	yes	1924-1928	France
Renault	Renault SH		heavy truck-tank transporter	yes	1929-1930	France
Renault	Renault TI-4AE		medium truck	yes	1935-1938	France
Renault	Renault TS		medium truck	yes	1930-1931	France
Renault	Renaut UD6AE		medium truck	yes	1937	France
Renault	Renault VT6		heavy truck-tank transporter	yes	1932	France
Renault	Renault YF		medium truck	yes	1932-1935	France
Renault	Renault ZI		medium truck	yes	1933-1938	France
Renault	Renault AGC		light truck	yes		France
Renault	Renault AGT		medium truck	yes		France
Renault	Renault ADR		medium truck	yes		France
Renault	Renault AGP		medium truck	yes	1937-?	France
Renault	Renault AGR		medium truck	yes	1937-?	France
Renault	Renault AGK		heavy truck	yes	1937-?	France
Renault	Renault AHS		medium truck	yes	1940-1944	France, German occupation forces
Renault	Renault AHN		medium truck	yes	1940-1944	France, German occupation forces
Renault	Renault AHR		heavy truck	no	1940-1944	France, German occupation forces
Renault	Renault CBH		heavy truck	yes	1986-1997	Bangladesh (n)
Renault	Renault R-2067/R-2087/R-2066/R-2086		light truck	no	1949-1955	France
Renault	Renault R-2164/R-2167/2265		light truck	no	1949-1955	France
Renault	Renault R-2152/R-4152		medium truck	no	1953-1958	France
Renault	Renault R-4153/R-2185/R-2182		heavy truck/tractor	no	1955-1958	France
Renault	Renault TRM1200		light truck	no	1980-?	France
Renault	Renault TRM-2000		medium truck	no	1980-?	France
Renault	Renault TRM-4000		medium truck	no	1980-?	France
Renault	Renault TRM-6000		heavy truck	no	1980-?	France (n)
Renault	Renault TRM-9000/TRM 10000		heavy truck	no	1985-?	France (n)
Renault	Renault 50		medium truck	yes	1987-1993	United Kingdom
Renault	Renault TRM-150.11		truck	no		France (n)
Renault	Renault GBC 180		medium truck	no	1993-2004	France (n)
Renault	Renault TRM 180.11		light truck	no		Bangladesh (n)
Renault	Renault TRM-700.100T		tractor-tank transporter	no	1993-?	France (n)
Renault	Renault Midlum		heavy truck	yes	2000–2013	Bangladesh (n)
REO	REO 29XS		heavy truck	no	1942-1945	United States
REO	REO 29XS F1		tractor	no	1942-1945	United States
REO	REO 28X6		tractor	no	1942-1944	United States
REO	REO US6		medium truck	no	1943-1945	USSR, China, Australia
REO	M35		medium truck/tractor	no	1951-early 1970s	Argentina, Austria, Brazil, Cambodia, Canada, Chile, Taiwan, Colombia, Democratic Republic of Congo, Dominican Republic, Ecuador, Egypt, El Salvador, Greece, Honduras, Indonesia, Iraq, Israel, Lebanon, Republic of Macedonia, Mexico, Monaco, Nicaragua, Moldova, Philippines, Pakistan, Saudi Arabia, Sweden, Thailand, Tunisia, Turkey, United States (later), Venezuela, Vietnam
Reynolds Boughton	Reynolds Boughton RB44		medium truck	no	1978-1997	United Kingdom
Rochet-Schneider	Rochet-Schneider 3T		truck	yes	1913-?	France
Rochet-Schneider	Rochet-Schneider 1T2		light truck	yes	1915-1918	France
Rochet-Schneider	Rochet-Schneider 420VLES		heavy truck	yes	1936-1945	France
Rotinoff	Rotinoff Super Atlantic		tractor-tank transporter	yes	1958-1960	Switzerland
Russo-Balt	Russo-Balt D/M		light truck	yes	1912-1915	Russian Empire
Russo-Balt	Russo-Balt T		medium/heavy truck	yes	1913-1915	Russian Empire
SAMIL	SAMIL-20		medium truck	no	1977-1998	South Africa (n)
SAMIL	SAMIL-50		medium truck	no	1977-1998	South Africa (n)
SAMIL	SAMIL-100		heavy truck	no	1977-1998	South Africa (n)
Saurer	Saurer AA		light truck	yes	1914-1918	Switzerland, France, Belgium, Austria
Saurer	Saurer AB		medium truck	yes	1914-1918	Switzerland, France, Belgium, Austria
Saurer	Saurer AC		heavy truck	yes	1914-1918	Switzerland, France, Belgium, Austria
Saurer	Saurer AE		artillery tractor	no	1917	Switzerland
Saurer	Saurer M6 (6M)		medium truck	no	1940-1948	Switzerland
Saurer	Saurer M8 (8M)		medium truck	no	1943-1945	Switzerland
Saurer	Saurer MH4 (4M)		artillery tractor	no	1945-19?	Switzerland
Saurer	Saurer 2 CM		medium truck	no	1949-?	Switzerland
Saurer	Saurer 4 CM		heavy truck	no	1949-?	Switzerland
Saurer	Saurer 5 CM		heavy truck	no	1949-?	Switzerland
Saurer	Saurer 3CM		heavy truck	no	1954-1957	France (Air Force)
Saurer	Saurer 6GAVFR		medium truck/artillery tractor	no	1958-1960	Austria
Saurer	Saurer 2DM		heavy truck	yes	1959-1972	Switzerland
Saurer	Saurer 5DM		heavy truck	yes	1959-1973	Switzerland
Saurer	Saurer 6DM		heavy truck	no	1983-1986	Switzerland
Saurer	Saurer 10DM		heavy truck	no	1983-1986	Switzerland
Saviem	Saviem R-2152		medium truck	no	1955-1958	France
Saviem	Saviem R-2182		tractor	no	1955-1958	France
Saviem	Saviem R-4152		medium truck	no	1955-1960	France
Saviem	Saviem R-7521		heavy truck	no	1961-1965	France
Saviem	Saviem M-14A1		light tractor	no		France
Saviem	Saviem TP3		light truck	yes	1969-1984	France
Saviem	Saviem SM8		medium truck	no	1973-?	France
Scania-Vabis	Scania-Vabius T-3		artillery tractor	no	1917-1918	Sweden
Scania-Vabis	Scania-Vabis F11		medium truck	no	1942-?	Sweden
Scania-Vabis	Scania-Vabis LA82 (Ltgb-957GF)		heavy truck	no	1960-1963	Sweden (n)
Scania	Scania SBA/SBA111		heavy truck/artillery tractor	no	1975-1979	Sweden (n)
Scania	Scania LT146		tractor-tank transporter	yes	1976-?	Sweden
Scania	Scania P92MK/HK		heavy truck	yes	1980-1987	Sweden
Scania	Scania R112E/P112H		heavy truck	yes	1980-1987	Sweden
Scania	Scania R142E/T142E		tractor-tank transporter	no	1980-1987	Sweden
Scania	Scania P93MK		heavy truck	no	1987-1996	Sweden, Norway (n)
Scania	Scania P113HK		heavy truck	yes	1987-1996	Sweden (n)
Scania	Scania R143EK		tractor-tank transporter	no	1987-1996	Sweden
Scania	Scania T144GB6x4NZ		tractor-tank transporter	yes	2011-2005	Sweden, Belgium (n)
Simca	Simca F594WMC/F594WML		medium truck	no	1956-1963	African countries, South East Asia
Simca	Simca-UNIC-Marmon-Bocquet MH600BSA		light/medium truck	no	1964-1973	NATO
Sisu	Sisu KB-45		medium truck	no	1964-1970	Finland
Sisu	Sisu A-45		medium truck	no	1970-1982	Finland
Sisu	Sisu SA-150		heavy truck	no	1982-1991	Finland
Sisu	Sisu SA-240/SA-241		heavy truck	no	1984-1991	Finland (n)
Sisu	Sisu E11 HMTV		heavy truck	no	1998-2008	Finland
Sisu	Sisu E11 FMTV		extra heavy truck	no	1999-2008	Finland
Škoda Works	Skoda U (50HP)		artillery tractor	no	1919-?	Czechoslovakia
Škoda Auto	Skoda 6LT6-L		medium truck	no	1936-1937	Czechoslovakia
Škoda	Skoda 6ST6-T		medium truck/tractor	no	1937-1939	Czechoslovakia
Škoda	Skoda 6S/6V		medium truck/tractor	no	1936-1939	Czechoslovakia
Škoda	Skoda 6VTP6-T		tractor-tank transporter	no	1936-1939	Czechoslovakia
Škoda	Skoda RSO		artillery tractor	no	1941-1944	Germany (branches in USSR)
Škoda	Skoda 4S		tractor	no	1946	Norway
S.P.A.	SPA-8000/9000		medium truck	no	1912-1918	Italy
S.P.A.	SPA 25C10		medium truck	yes	1924-2-nd part 1930s	Italy
S.P.A.	SPA 36R/38R		medium truck	no	2-nd part 1930s-1948	Italy
S.P.A.	SPA-Dovunque-35		medium truck	no	1935-1948	Italy
S.P.A.	SPA TL37		artillery tractor	no	1937-1948	Italy
S.P.A.	SPA TM40		artillery tractor	no	1940-1948	Italy
S.P.A.	SPA T40		medium truck	no	1941-1948	Italy
S.P.A.	SPA CL39		light truck-artillery tractor	no	1939-1944	Italy
S.P.A.	SPA-Dovinque-41		heavy truck	no	1942-1949	Italy
Star	Star 66/660		medium truck	no	1958-1976	Poland
Star	Star 266		medium truck	no	1973-2000	Poland (n), Angola, Myanmar, Hungary, Lithuania (n), Yemen, Libya, USSR
Star	Star 744		medium truck	yes	1996-2000	Poland
Star	Star 944		medium truck	no	2000-2007	Poland
Star	Star 1466		medium truck	no	2001-2007	Poland
Stewart & Stevenson	FMTV		medium truck	no	1992-2006	United States (n), Thailand (n), Iraq (n), Jordan (n)
Steyr	Steyr 40D (140/340/640)		light truck	no	1932-1941	Austria, Germany
Steyr	Steyr 270 (1500A)		light truck	no	1941-1944	Germany
Steyr	Steyr 2000A		light truck	no	1944-1945	Germany
Steyr	Steyr 480		medium truck	yes	1957-1969	Austria
Steyr	Haflinger		extra light truck	no	1959-1974	Austria, Switzerland, Australia
Steyr	Steyr 680M/680M3		medium truck	yes	1966-1979	Austria, Switzerland, Greece
Steyr	Steyr 1291/1491		heavy truck/tractor	yes	1979-200?	Austria, Canada, Greece, Saudi Arabia, Switzerland
Steyr	Steyr 12M18/12M21		heavy truck	no	1986-200?	Austria (n)
Steyr	Steyr 12M23/35M36		heavy truck/tractor	yes	1990-200?	Austria
Steyr	Steyr 14.224LAC/18.264LAE		heavy truck	yes	1996-2003	Austria
Steyr-Daimler-Puch	Pinzgauer		light truck	yes	1971–2007	Argentina (n), Austria (n)
Studebaker	electromobile		extra light/light/medium truck	no	1908-1914	United States (warehouses of Navy)
Studebaker	Studebaker K15F		light truck	yes	1940-1945	United States
Studebaker	Studebaker K25S		medium truck	yes	1940-1945	United States
Studebaker	Studebaker US6		medium truck/tractor	no	1942-1945	USSR, China, Australia
Studebaker	M35		medium truck	no	1951-1964	Argentina, Austria, Brazil, Cambodia, Canada, Chile, Taiwan, Colombia, Democratic Republic of Congo, Dominican Republic, Ecuador, Egypt, El Salvador, Greece, Honduras, Indonesia, Iraq, Israel, Lebanon, Republic of Macedonia, Mexico, Monaco, Nicaragua, Moldova, Philippines, Pakistan, Saudi Arabia, Sweden, Thailand, Tunisia, Turkey, United States (later), Venezuela, Vietnam
Tatra	Tatra 26/30		light truck	no	1929	Czechoslovakia
Tatra	Tatra 23		medium truck	no	1926-1933	Czechoslovakia
Tatra	Tatra 24		heavy truck	yes	1928-1939	Czechoslovakia
Tatra	Tatra 25		artillery tractor	no	1926-1934	Czechoslovakia
Tatra	Tatra 82		light truck	no	1935-1938	Czechoslovakia
Tatra	Tatra 92		medium truck	no	1938-1939	Germany, Romania
Tatra	Tatra 93		medium truck	no	1938-1939	Romania
Tatra	Tatra 27		medium truck	yes	1931-1946	Czechoslovakia, Germany
Tatra	Tatra 28		medium truck	no	1932-1935	Czechoslovakia
Tatra	Tatra 22		tractor	no	1934-1935	Czechoslovakia
Tatra	Tatra 29		tractor	no	1934-1935	Czechoslovakia
Tatra	Tatra 85		medium truck	yes	1936-1941	Czechoslovakia
Tatra	Tatra 81		heavy truck	yes	1939-1941	Germany
Tatra	Tatra 111		heavy truck	yes	1942-1962	Czechoslovakia, Hungary, Romania
Tatra	Tatra 805		light truck	yes	1955-1960	Czechoslovakia
Tatra	Tatra 128		medium truck	no	1951-1952	Czechoslovakia
Tatra	Tatra 141		ballast tractor	yes	1957-1970	Czechoslovakia
Tatra	Tatra 138		heavy tractor	yes	1959-1971	Czechoslovakia
Tatra	Tatra 148		heavy truck/tractor	yes	1969-1982	Czechoslovakia, Poland
Tatra	Tatra 813		heavy truck/tractor	no	1967-1982	Czechoslovakia
Tatra	Tatra 815/Armax		heavy truck/tractor/ballast tractor	yes	1982-2011 (production of a civilian version continues)	Czechoslovakia, Czech Republic (n), Romania, Slovakia, Saudi Arabia, UAE, India, Italy, France
Thornycroft	Thornycroft Nubian		medium truck			United Kingdom
Thornycroft	Thornycroft Antar		heavy truck tractor-tank transporter			United Kingdom
Tovarna avtomobilov Maribor	TAM 1500		light truck	no	1952-197?	Yugoslavia
Tovarna avtomobilov Maribor	TAM 2000		medium truck	no	1950s-1970s	Yugoslavia
Tovarna avtomobilov Maribor	TAM 110		light truck	no	1975-1996	Yugoslavia, Serbia (n), UN, Slovenia
Tovarna avtomobilov Maribor	TAM 150		medium truck	no	1975-1996	Yugoslavia, Serbia (n), UN, Croatia (n), Bosnia and Herzegovina (n), Slovenia
Tovarna avtomobilov Maribor	TAM-162T9		medium truck	yes	2000-2003	Slovenia
Tovarna avtomobilov Maribor	TAM-182T10		medium truck	no	2003-2011	Slovenia
Toyota	Toyota KB/KC		light truck	no	1942-1944	Japan
Toyota	Toyota FG10		medium truck	no	mid 1950s-?	Japan
Toyota	Toyota FQS		medium truck	no	mid 1950s-?	Japan
Toyota	Toyota DW15L		medium truck	no	1960s-early 1970s	Japan
Unic	Unic P107B		semi-tracked artillery tractor	1935-1940	France, Germany (Zgkw U-304)	
Unic	Unic TU-1		semi-tracked artillery tractor	no	1939-1940	France, Germany
UralAZ	Ural-375D		medium truck/tractor	yes	1961-1992	USSR, Poland, Serbia (n), East Germany, Vietnam
UralAZ	Ural-43223		heavy truck	yes	1992-1994	Russia
Vehicle Factory Jabalpur	VFJ Vahan 1 ton		light truck, multi-role	no	1958-1996	India
Vehicle Factory Jabalpur	VFJ Shaktiman		heavy truck, multi-role	no	1958-1996	India
Vehicle Factory Jabalpur	VFJ Shaktiman Tipper		tipper	no	1958-1996	India
Vehicle Factory Jabalpur	VFJ Matang		heavy truck	no		India
Ward LaFrance	Ward LaFrance M1		heavy wrecker	no	1940-1943	United States, USSR
Ward LaFrance	Ward LaFrance M1A1		heavy wrecker	no	1943-1945	United States, USSR
Ward LaFrance	Ward LaFrance M746		tractor-tank transporter	no	1972–1973, 1978	United States (branches in Western Europe), NATO, Morocco
Weiss	Weiss H1/H2		truck	no	1929-1935	Hungary
White	White TEBO		light truck	yes	1910s	United States, France, United Kingdom, Russian Empire
White	White TBC		light truck	yes	1912-1918	United States, France
White	White T3		ballast artillery tractor	yes	1930-?	United States
White	White 704S		medium truck	yes	1939-1940	France
White	White 920		heavy truck	yes	1940	France, United Kingdom
White	White-Ruxtall 922		tank transporter, ballast tractor	yes	1939-1940	United Kingdom
White	White 666		heavy truck/tractor	no	1941-1945	United States
White	White 1064		heavy truck/tractor	no	1941-1945	United States
White	White 444T		tractor	no	1941-1945	United States
White	M35		medium truck/tractor	no	1957-early 1970s	Argentina, Austria, Brazil, Cambodia, Canada, Chile, Taiwan, Colombia, Democratic Republic of Congo, Dominican Republic, Ecuador, Egypt, El Salvador, Greece, Honduras, Indonesia, Iraq, Israel, Lebanon, Republic of Macedonia, Mexico, Monaco, Nicaragua, Moldova, Philippines, Pakistan, Saudi Arabia, Sweden, Thailand, Tunisia, Turkey, United States (later), Venezuela, Vietnam
Willème			heavy truck	yes	1920s	France
Willeme	Willeme D9		tank transporter	no	1929-1937	France
Willeme	Willeme DU10/DU12/DG12/R15		heavy truck	yes	1930s	France
Willeme	Willeme DW12A		tank-transporter	no	1937-?	France
Willeme	Willeme LD610N		heavy truck	yes	1956-1959	France
Willeme	Willeme L6DAT		tractor	yes	the second half of the 1950s	France
Willeme	Willeme RD615D/W6DAT		heavy truck/tractor	yes	the second half of the 1950s	France (Air Force)
Willeme	Willeme W8SA		recovery vehicle	yes	1954	France
Willeme	Willeme CG		aerodrome recovery vehicle	no	1961-1968	France (Air Force)
Western Star Trucks	Western Star M4866S		heavy truck	no		Bangladesh (n)
ZIS	ZIS-6		medium truck	yes	1933-1941	USSR, Lithuania
ZIS	ZIS-5V (ZIS-5 of war time)		medium truck	no	1942-1945	USSR, Vietnam
ZIS	ZIS-32		medium truck	no	1941	USSR
ZIS	ZIS-22		semi-tracked medium truck	no	1938-1940	USSR
ZIS	ZIS-33		semi-tracked medium truck	no	1940	USSR
ZIS	ZIS-35		semi-tracked medium truck	no	1940-1941	USSR
ZIS	ZIS-42/42M		semi-tracked medium truck	no	1942-1946	USSR
ZIS	ZIS-150		medium truck	yes	1947-1956	USSR, China, Vietnam
ZIS	ZIS-151		medium truck	no	1948-1958	USSR, Poland, Romania
ZIL	ZIL-157		medium truck/tractor	yes	1958-1992	USSR, Poland
ZIL	ZIL-131		medium truck/tractor	no	1961-1994	USSR, Afghanistan, Armenia (n), Bulgaria, Czechoslovakia, East Germany, Hungaria (n), Iraq, Peru (n), Poland, Romania (n), Russia (n), Serbia, Ukraine (n)
ZIL	Zil-137		medium truck	no	1966-	Bangladesh (n)
ZIL	ZIL-433460		medium truck	no	1994-200?	Russia

== See also ==
- Truck
- Pickup Truck
- List of trucks
- List of pickup trucks
