= Renault ZP, ABF and ABG =

Renault ABF/ABG
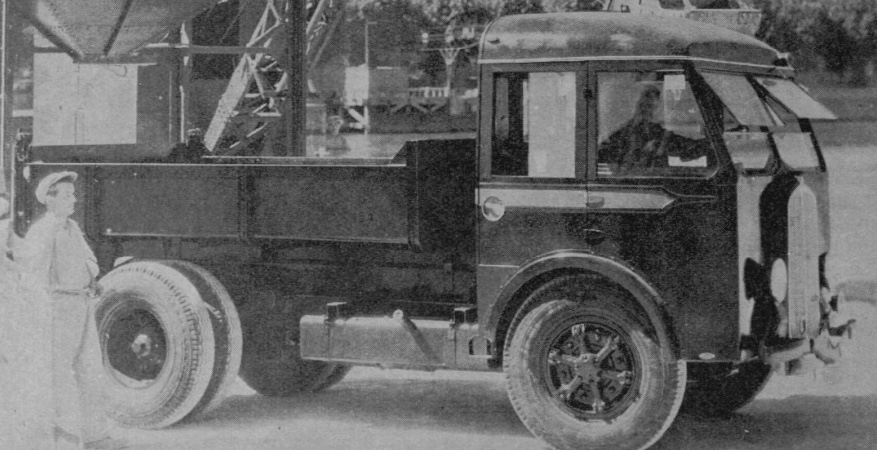
- A Renault ABF

Overview
- Type: Medium truck
- Manufacturer: Renault
- Also called: Renault ABF; Renault ABG
- Production: 1934–1937
- Assembly: Boulogne-Billancourt, France

Body and chassis
- Body style: COE
- Layout: Front-engine, rear-wheel drive

Powertrain
- Transmission: 4-speed manual

Chronology
- Predecessor: Early 1930s Renault commercial vehicles
- Successor: Renault AGx

The Renault ZP/ABF/ABG is a range of medium-duty forward control trucks produced by Renault between 1934 and 1937. The range was made of the ABF and the ABG. Renault also developed a bus/coach called the ZP using the same cabin.

== History ==
By 1934, the French government established various restrictions on commercial vehicles, among them a decree that imposed limits on design, including: the overall width of a road vehicle should not exceed 2 metres 35 centimetres and the overall length 10 metres. The overall length of a tractor-trailer unit should not exceed 12 metres. The gross combined weight of any laden vehicle should not exceed 15 tonnes, and the load on any axle 10 tonnes. The average weight per metre of length of any vehicle should not exceed 4 tonnes in the case of vehicles with two axles. As a result of these restrictions, Renault began to introduce forward control designs, replacing the normal control (conventional cabin) it had been using in the early 1930s. In September 1934, the company unveiled a forward control truck for 1935 at the Paris Salon, the ABF (5-tonne payload truck), and announced a second, the ABG tractor unit (hauling capacity of up to 10 tonnes), which was unveiled at the Brussels Salon in November of that year.

=== ABF ===
The ABF was the first forward control truck from Renault. In 1937, the French military commissioned a couple of ABFs adapted to use natural gas as part of a push for alternatives to petroleum-derived fuels. In the early 1940s ABFs were fitted with a trolley pole and electrical equipment on front, as part of an experiment on electrical trucks. The ABF was put out of production in late 1937 and replaced by the AGK.

=== ABG ===
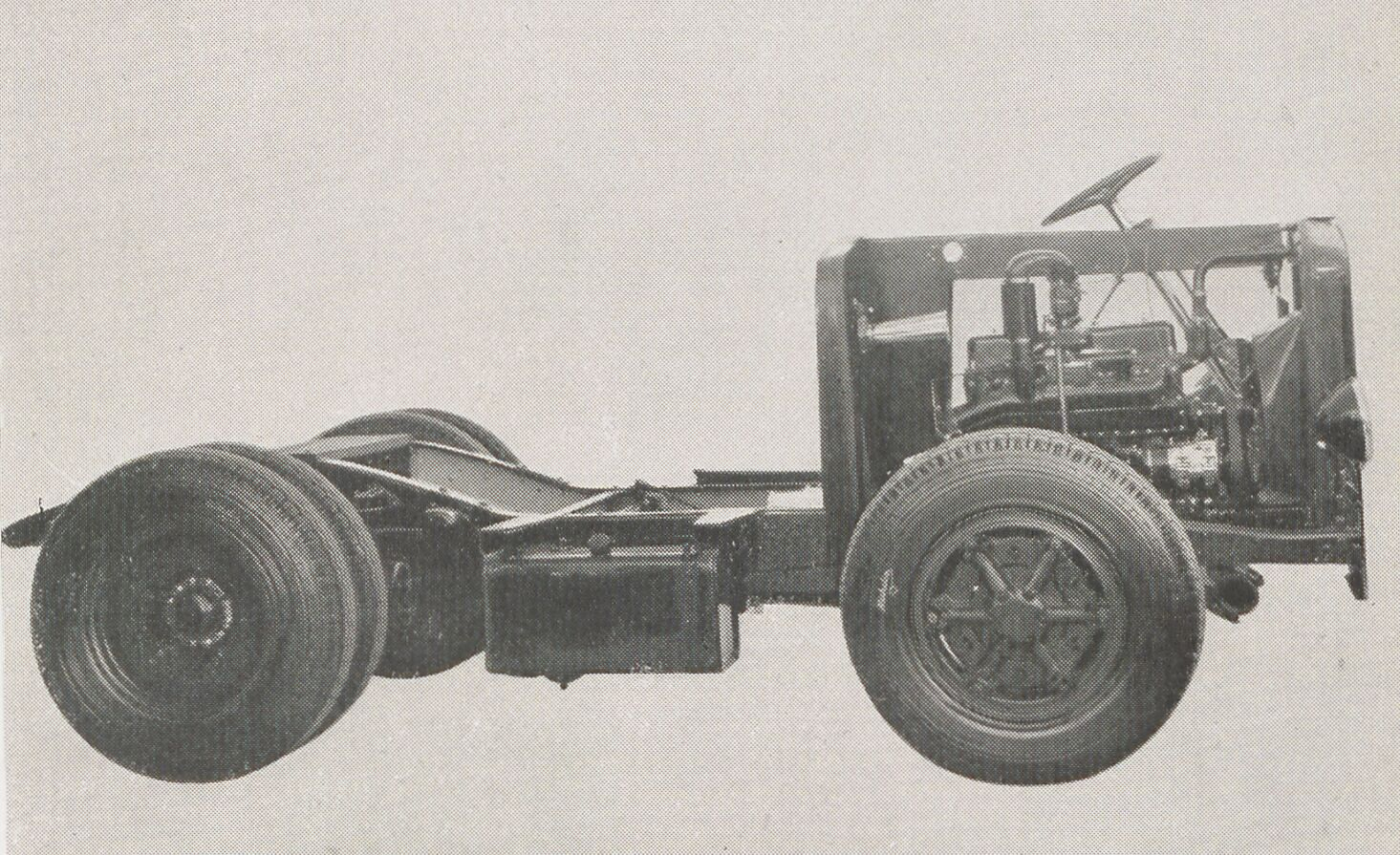
Renault ABG

The ABG was primarily aimed to be used as a tractor unit. The Societé Algerienne des Transports Tropicaux, a company focused on trans-Saharan travel, commissioned ABGs bodied as mixed vehicles with a second row of seats in the cabin, which was lengthened accordingly, making them able to take three to four passengers. The ABG was retired from Renault's lineup in late 1937.

== Technical details ==
The ABF and the ABG have the same inline-four engines: a 5.9-litre petrol unit and an 8.4-litre diesel, both delivering 85 metric horsepower (63 kW) at 2,000 and 1,600 rpm respectively. The ABF has servomechanical brakes and the ABG has both servomechanical and air brakes. The suspension on both trucks is by leaf springs. Wheelbases are 2.4 metres (ABG), 2.6 metres (ABF short), and 3.4 metres (ABF long).

The trucks have double wheels on the rear axle. Their gearbox is 4-speed manual.

The maximum gross combined weight ratings are 6 tonnes for the ABF and 13 tonnes for the ABG (tractor unit with towed cargo), with 5 and 10 tonnes payload respectively.

== Renault ZP ==
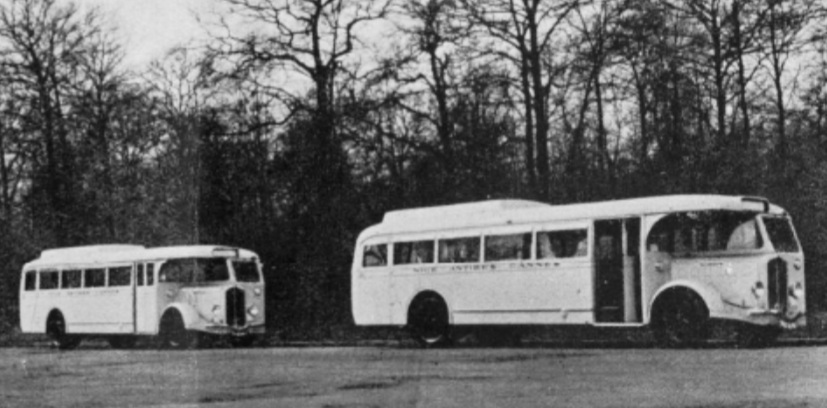
Renaults ZP short and long. The cabin design for the ZP was also used by the ABF long single seat.

The Renault ZP is a bus/coach introduced by Renault at the same time that the ABF/ABG range, using the same cabin. It was initially powered by the same petrol engine mounted by the ABF/ABG, delivering a power between 85 metric horsepower (63 kW) and 99 metric horsepower (73 kW) at 2,400 rpm. For 1936 it added the ABF/ABG diesel engine, tuned for 85 metric horsepower (63 kW)–90 metric horsepower (66 kW) at 1,600 rpm. There were two lengths available for the ZP, with a maximum length of 8.57 metres. The ZP short has 23–28 passenger seats and the long 31–36. The suspension of both is made up of leaf springs with hydraulic dampers. The gearbox is a 4-speed manual unit.

By 1937, the ZP adopted the AGK's cabin.

Gasifier-equipped ZPs were used for urban transit services. It was also used by trans-Saharan transport services.

After World War II, Renault introduced a ZP-based bus/coach called 215 D (later renamed as the R-series). It was produced from 1946 to 1949.
