= Renault AGx =

Overview
- Type: Light/medium/heavy truck
- Manufacturer: Renault
- Also called: Renault AGC; Renault AGK; Renault AGP; Renault AGR; Renault AGT; Renault AGOD; Renault AGLD
- Production: 1937–1941
- Assembly: Boulogne-Billancourt, France

Body and chassis
- Layout: Front-engine, rear-wheel drive

Powertrain
- Transmission: 4-speed manual (light/medium models); 5-speed manual (heavy models)

Chronology
- Predecessor: Renault ABF/ABG/Renault ADx
- Successor: Renault AHx

The Renault AGx was a range of light/medium/heavy trucks produced by the French manufacturer Renault between 1937 and 1941. The range includes both conventional (AGC, AGT) and forward control (AGK, AGP, AGR, AGOD, AGLD) trucks.

== History and technical details ==
=== AGS ===
The AGS was a commercial and military version of the Renault Primaquatre with a payload of 0.4 tonnes.

=== AGC ===
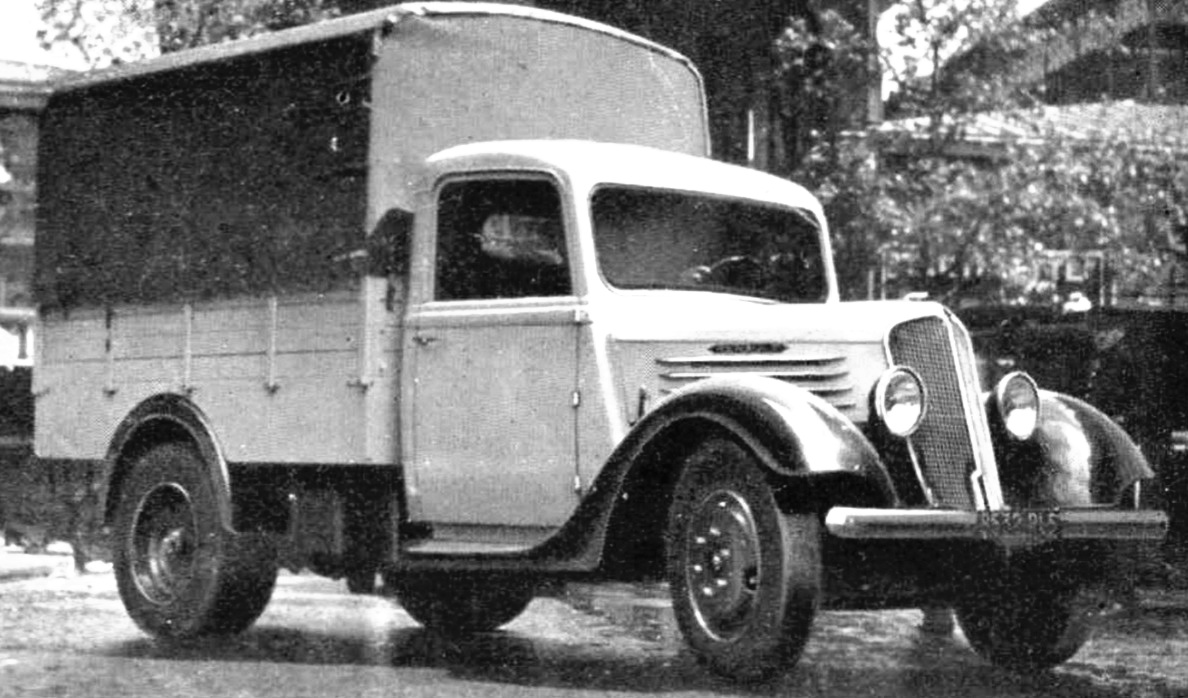
A typical conventional-cabined AGx, the Renault AGC.

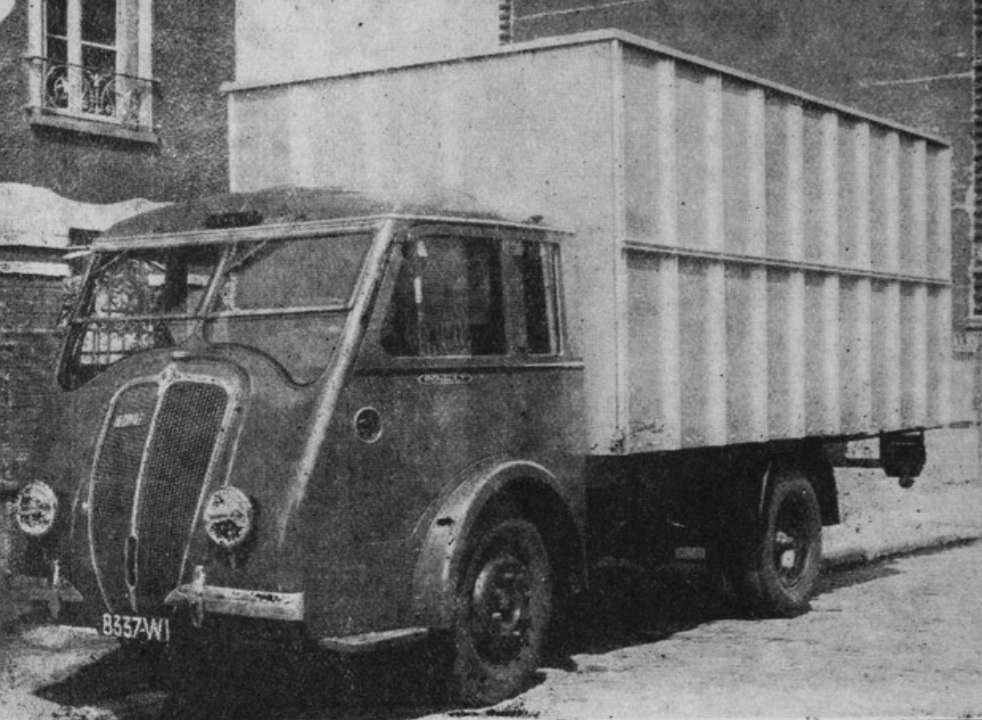
An AGP long. All forward-control AGxs have the same cabin styling.

The Renault AGC is a conventional cabin light truck with a 1.5 tonnes payload produced between 1938 and 1940. It replaced the Renault ADK. For military use, it was delivered with a wheelbase of 3,760 millimetres (148 in), a length between 5,680 millimetres (224 in) (long version) and 5,000 millimetres (200 in), and width of 1,950 millimetres (77 in). The engine was a 2.4-litre inline-four unit with a maximum power output of 44 metric horsepower (32 kW) at 2,800 rpm. The gearbox was a 4-speed manual unit. Besides a simple truck, the AGC was produced as a van and as a bus for 12 to 14 passengers.

=== AGT ===
The Renault AGT is a conventional cabin light truck with a 2.5 tonnes payload produced between 1937 and 1940. It replaced the long version of the Renault ADH. For military use, it was delivered with a 4,110 millimetres (162 in) wheelbase (which was common to all versions), a 6,350 millimetres (250 in) length and a 2,100 millimetres (83 in) width. Its engine is a 4-litre inline-six petrol unit with a power output of 66 metric horsepower (49 kW) at 2,800 rpm. The truck has a 4-speed manual gearbox.

=== AGP ===
The Renault AGP is a forward control light truck with a payload between 2.5 and 3 tonnes. It has a wheelbase between 2,550 millimetres (100 in) and 3,080 millimetres (121 in) and a width of 2,350 millimetres (93 in). The engines are a 4-litre inline-four petrol unit and a 4.7-litre inline-four diesel, the AGPs using the latter are known as AGPD. The power output of both engines is 65 metric horsepower (48 kW). The truck has a 4-speed manual gearbox.

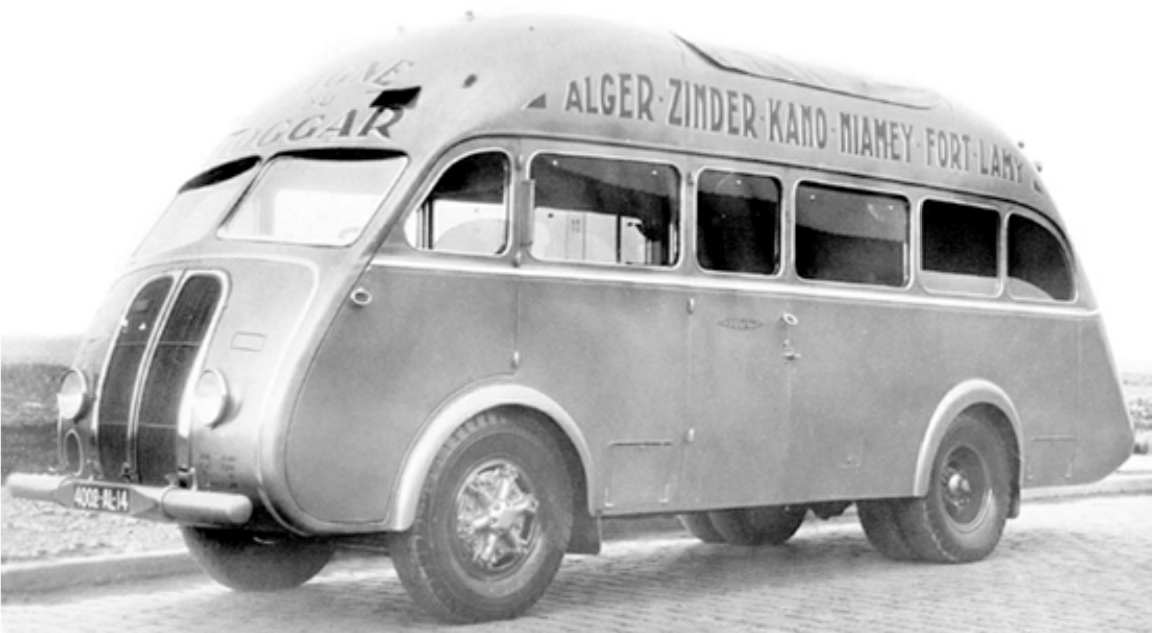
An AGP-based coach from the SATT

In 1937, the Société Algérienne des Transports Tropicaux (SATT) commissioned a new AGP-based coach for its trans-Saharan passenger service to replace the heavier Renaults AKGD it was using before. The coach design was led by SATT's chief Georges Estienne who also had designed a previous coach based on the six-wheeler Renault OX. The new had a van-like streamlined steel bodywork with a length of 7,060 millimetres (278 in). It used an 85 metric horsepower (63 kW) petrol engine and included 7 seats for passengers.

The AGP only had a limited military use. AGPD units were commissioned by the Chinese military.

=== AGR ===
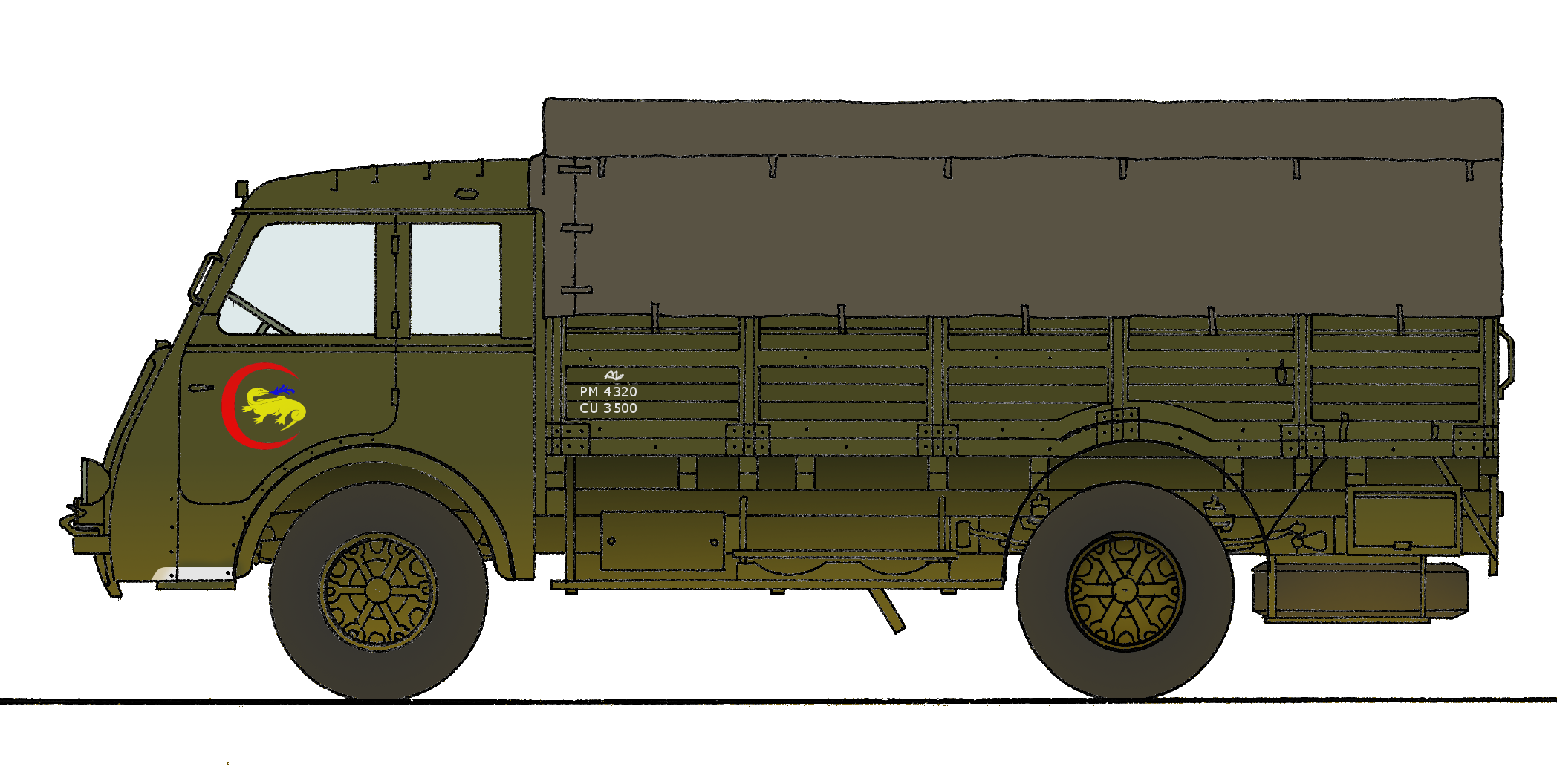
Drawing of a French Army AGR.

The forward control Renault AGR, produced between 1937 and 1941, is a medium truck with a payload of 3.5 tonnes. For military use, it was delivered in various versions: the most produced has a 3,250 millimetres (128 in) wheelbase (which was common to all versions), a 6,450 millimetres (254 in) length and a 2,310 millimetres (91 in) width. The engine is a 4-litre inline-four engine with a power output of 62 metric horsepower (46 kW) at 2,200 rpm. The truck also has a gasifier-equipped version. The gearbox is a 4-speed manual unit.

=== AGK ===
Drawing of a AGK for 1938

The forward control Renault AGK, introduced at the end of 1937 and produced until 1940, replaced the 1935 Renault ABF (one of the first forward control produced by the company). It has a payload between 5 and 6.5 tonnes. For military use, it was delivered in various versions: the most produced has a 4,000 millimetres (160 in) wheelbase (which was common to all versions), a 7,080 millimetres (279 in) length and a 2,350 millimetres (93 in) width. The "all purposes" TTN 30-31 version has a 7,430 millimetres (293 in) length and a 2,430 millimetres (96 in) width, the TTN 39 has a 7,570 millimetres (298 in) length. The tanker version has a 7,430 millimetres (293 in) length and a 2,200 millimetres (87 in) width. The "mobile workshop" version has a 7,700 millimetres (300 in) length and a 2,430 millimetres (96 in) width.

For commercial use, the AGK was available with four configurations: van, flatbed, tipper, and cabin only. The wheelbases were between 3,190 millimetres (126 in) and 4,000 millimetres (160 in).

All AGK versions use a 5.9-litre inline-four petrol engine delivering 80 metric horsepower (59 kW) (85 metric horsepower (63 kW) for the civilian version) at 2,000 rpm. The diesel version (AGKD) has an 8.4-litre inline-four engine. The truck has a 4-speed manual gearbox.

By 1937, the ZP bus/coach adopted the AGK cabin.

=== Heavier models ===
The Renaults AGLD and AGOD are heavy trucks. The AGOD was produced between 1937 and 1939 with a payload of 8 tonnes. Its engine is a 12.5-litre straight-six diesel with a power output of 130 metric horsepower (96 kW) at 1,500 rpm. Its wheelbase is between 3,560 millimetres (140 in) and 4,950 millimetres (195 in), its length between 6,900 millimetres (270 in) and 8,700 millimetres (340 in) and its width 2,340 millimetres (92 in). It has a 5-speed manual gearbox. The AGOD was used by the Compagnie Générale Transsharienne (CGT) as a truck as well as with a coach bodywork for its trans-Saharan transport service.

==== Other Renault heavy vehicles using the 12.5-litre engine ====
At the 1936 Paris Salon, Renault unveiled various forward-control vehicles for 1937 powered by the 12.5-litre diesel engine and with 5-speed gearboxes: the ADS, the ADT, the AFKD, and the AEMD.

The AFKD is a six-wheeler truck with a payload of 10 tonnes and servomechanical/air brakes. It was replaced in 1939 by the similarly looking Renault AIB, with air brakes and powered by a 5.9-litre engine delivering 85 metric horsepower (63 kW). The AEMD is a coach/bus of up to 43 places. AEMD sales were postponed until November 1937 and by that time it replaced the engine with a 15.7-litre straight-six diesel delivering 150 metric horsepower (110 kW). For 1939, the AEMD increased its capacity to up to 51 passengers. It was put out of sale later that year.
