= Early 1930s Renault commercial vehicles =

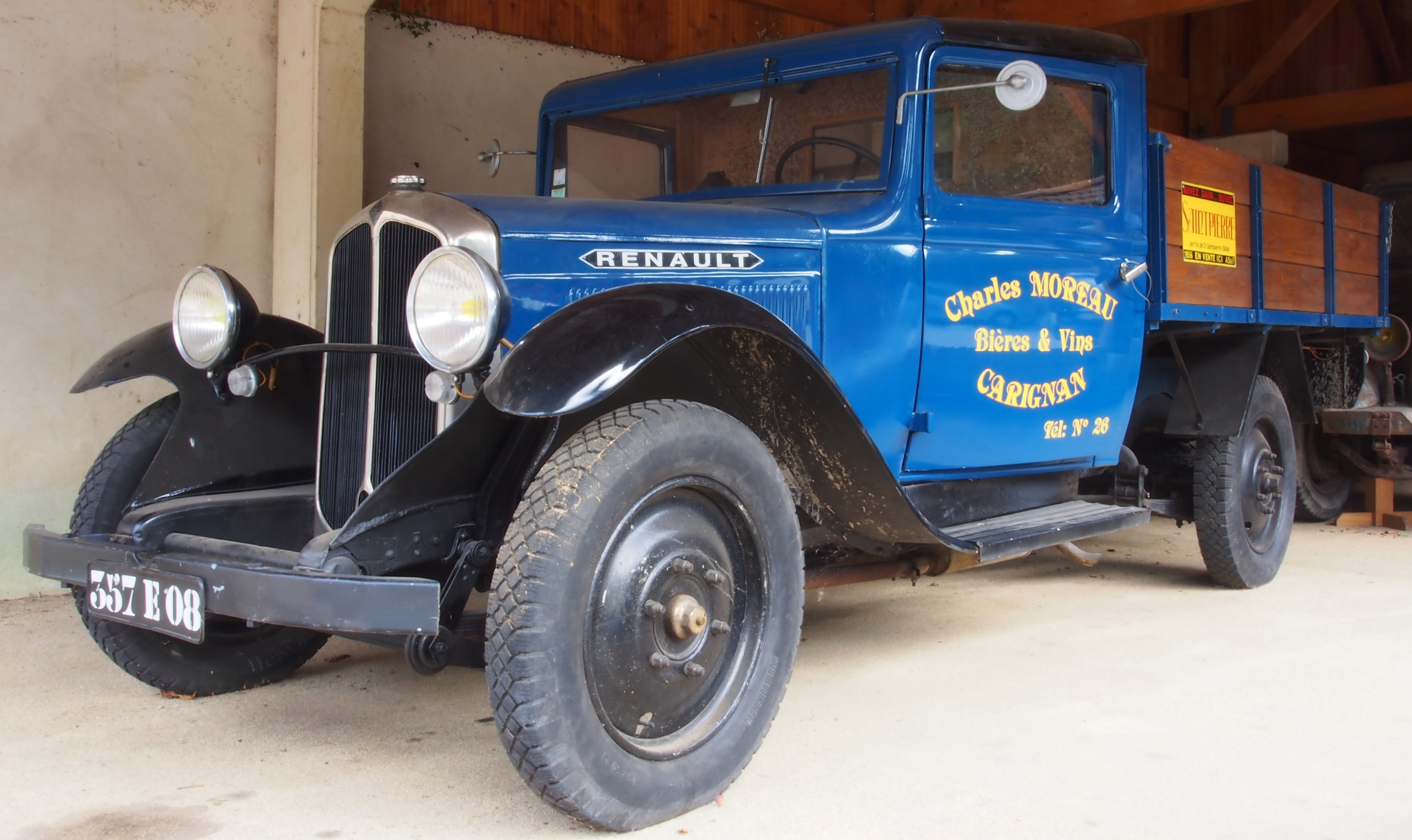
- A Renault OS (OSB model for 1933)

Overview
- Type: Various
- Manufacturer: Renault
- Production: 1930–1936
- Assembly: Boulogne-Billancourt, France

Body and chassis
- Layout: Front-engine, rear-wheel drive

Powertrain
- Transmission: 4-speed manual; 5-speed manual

Chronology
- Predecessor: Late 1920s Renault commercial vehicles
- Successor: Renault ZP, ABF and ABG; Renault ACx and ADx

The early 1930s Renault commercial vehicles were a range of modular chassis produced by Renault, sold under various configurations, primarily trucks, buses and coaches. The range was the first from Renault to get diesel engines and it abandoned previous design styles from the company. The range was gradually replaced from 1935 onwards by the ACx and ADx light range, the ABF/ABG medium range and the ZP bus/coach.

== History and overview ==
=== Beginnings of the early 1930s range ===
At the end of 1930, Renault ended production of its last "coalscuttle"-bonneted (with the radiator behind the engine) commercial vehicles, adopting more vertical grilles and, in some models, vertical slits on both sides of the engine compartment, as the radiator was moved ahead. At the same time, it was introducing its first diesel engines for road transport. These engines were a 7-litre inline-four and a 10.5-litre inline-six, both with direct injection. The inline-four was initially used on Renault's heavy trucks from 1930, and the inline-six was introduced in 1931. The engines had been extensively tested for two years and its development had as base Renault's experience on diesel marine engines, which allowed the company to create its own diesel engine technology instead of purchasing it to foreign manufacturers, as most of its French competitors did. The production of Renault's commercial range at the time was heavily modularised, with many standardised pieces, improving economies of scale, quality on mass production and also simplifying parts replacement. The light and mid-range commercial vehicles for 1931 were largely made up from evolutions of existing models: the RY and KZ (both with payloads under 1 tonne), the OS (1.3-1.8 tonne payload), the PR (2 tonnes payload), the SX (2 tonnes payload), and the SZ (3 tonnes payload). The upper ranges had a mix of new and updated but old models, including the TL (4 tonnes payload), TR (5.5 tonnes payload), TS (7.5 tonnes payload), TI, and two tractor units (SY and TT).

=== Range expansion ===
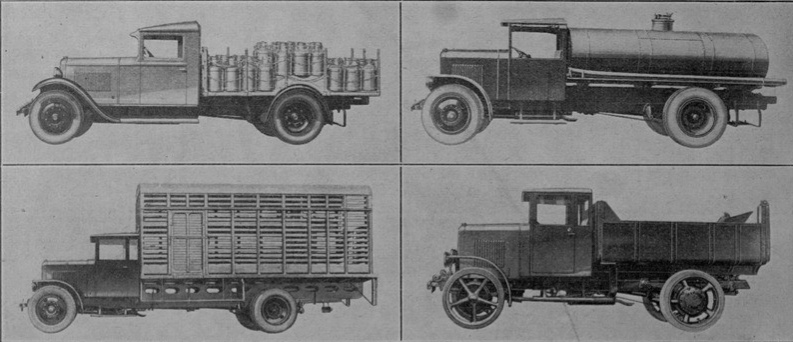
Some trucks for 1932. Clockwise from the top left: SZ, TS, TS short, and TI.

For 1932, the lower range consisted on further upgraded vehicles, using inline-four (all except SX and SZ) and inline-six (SX and SZ) petrol engines. Most of the upper range used the already mentioned diesel engines and two petrol ones: a 6-litre inline-four and a 9.1-litre inline-six. The TI (5.5 tonnes payload) and the UD (7.5 tonnes payload) mounted the four engines, the TS (8 tonnes payload) only the inline-four ones, and the 6x2 VT (12 tonnes payload) only the inline-six. The range was completed by two tractor units: the TT (hauling capacity of up to 15 tonnes), using the four upper range engines; and the SY (hauling capacity of up to 6 tonnes), using the engine mounted on the SX-SZ.

About 1931–1932, Renault unveiled a new 3.8 inline-four diesel engine called the C-90, to be used in future vehicles. It also introduced short-lived 6×4 petrol-engined trucks with articulated suspension: the UC (7-tonne payload or tractor unit up to 15 tonnes) and the UR (4-tonne payload).

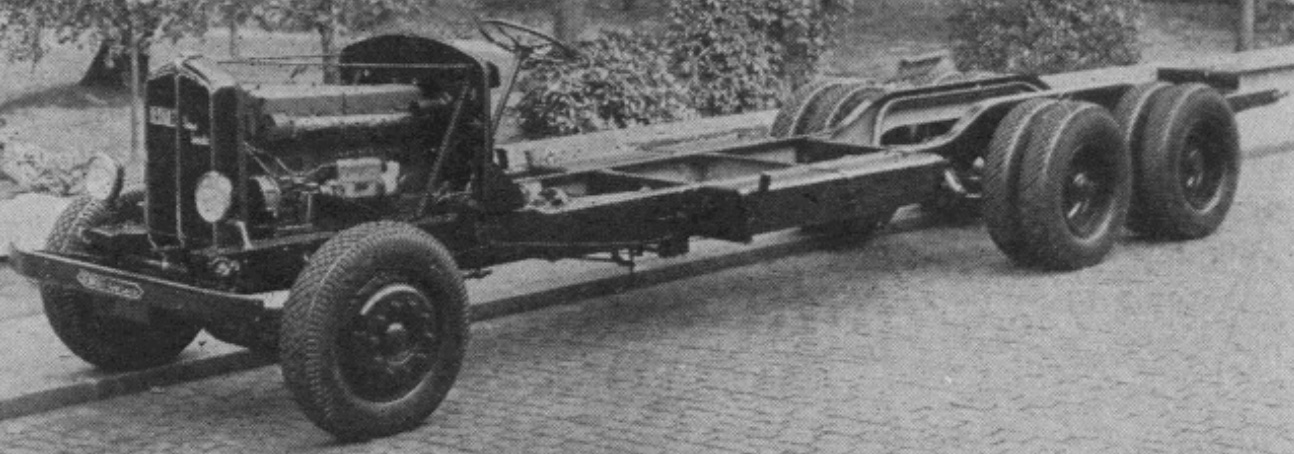
VT chassis for 1933 without bodywork

For the 1933 models, there were some changes compared to the ones for 1932: a new light vehicle called YP (0.75 tonnes payload), a new KZ chassis more focused on commercial use, the discontinuation of the TS. Renault also introduced vehicles with new diesel and petrol engines: the YF, replacing the SZ, and the YG tractor unit, replacing the SY. For 1934, Renault removed the SX, replacing it with the ZY (ZYAC, inline-four petrol, 2.5 tonnes payload) and started to phase out the PR, exchanging it for most uses with a new 2-tonne chassis, the ZJ, which was subject to less taxes and restrictions. A ZY version (ZYDC) received a new diesel engine, and both petrols and diesels for all the models were updated. The TI lost its inline-six petrol engine and the TT all its inline-four ones. A VT-based heavy truck, the ZF, was added to the lineup.

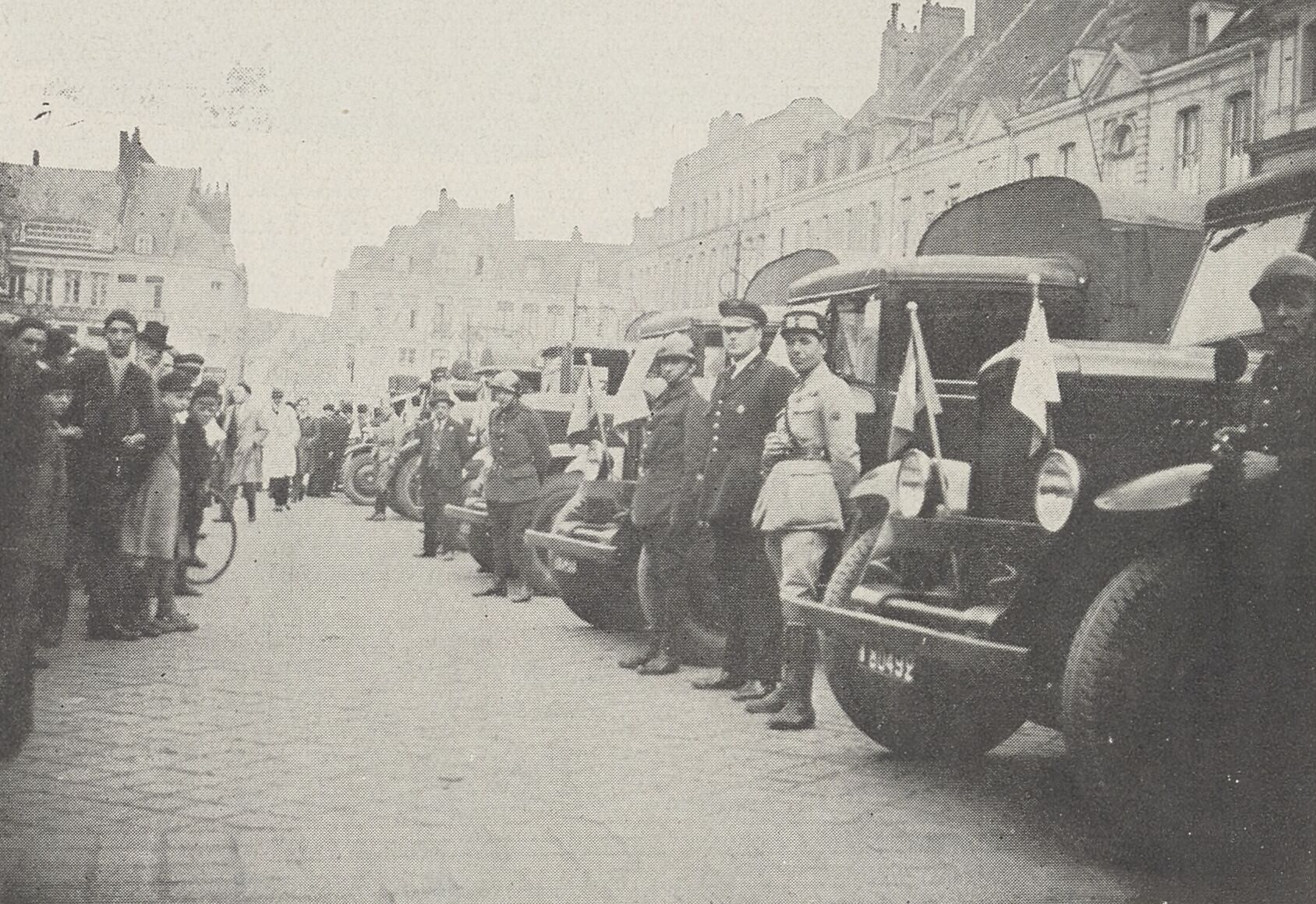
French military YFABs in 1933.

The French military commissioned various vehicles from Renault's commercial range, including the UD, the YF, the TI, and the PR.

=== End of the early 1930s range ===
By 1934, the French government established various restrictions on commercial vehicles. As a result of these, Renault began to introduce forward control designs, replacing the normal control (conventional cabin) it had been using in the early 1930s. At the 1934 Paris Salon, the company unveiled two forward control units for 1935: the ABF (5-tonne payload truck), the ZP (a coach), and announced a third, the ABG tractor unit (hauling capacity of up to 10 tonnes), which was unveiled at the Brussels Salon of that year. The petrol-engined versions of the TT and the VT were removed from the lineup. For 1935 Renault also retired its last flathead petrol engines from the commercial range and gave minor updates to the diesel ones. Lastly, the company introduced a new YF-based coach, the ZI.

At the 1935 Paris Salon, Renault presented basically the same 1935 range for 1936. In practice, all the early 1930s commercial vehicles up to 3.5 tonnes payload were discontinued during the 1935–1936 period, its boxy styling replaced with the more curvy Renault ACx and ADx range. Most normal-control commercial vehicles over 3.5 tonnes payload were also discontinued, the exception being the UD, which subsisted on the lineup until 1937. A TI variant (the TI 4 AE) was produced for the military until 1938.

== Technical details ==
=== 1931 lineup ===
The Renault's commercial vehicle range for 1931 has gross combined weight ratings of up to 8.5 tonnes (for rigid trucks) and 16 tonnes (for tractor units with towed cargo). The bus/coach bodywork variants can carry between 10 (OS model) and up to 40 passengers (TI and TI N models).

Model	Chassis code	Engines					Payload	Chassis lengths	Gearboxes	Type
Model	Chassis code	Fuel	C.	Displacement	Fiscal power	Power	Payload	Chassis lengths	Gearboxes	Type
Mona 6 (Note: The two first models were sold by Renault's passenger vehicle division. Renault also sold the six-wheelers MH and OX and the TN buses for special purposes.)	RY2	Petrol	6	1,463 cc	8 CV	26 PS (19 kW)	400 kg	1	3-speed manual	Light van
KZ	KZ	Petrol	4	2,120 cc	11 CV	33 PS (24 kW)	600 kg	2	3-speed manual	Light van
OS	OS3	Petrol	4	2,120 cc	11 CV	33 PS (24 kW)	1,300–1,800 kg	1	4-speed manual	Light truck and bus/coach
PR	PR3	Petrol	4	2,120 cc	11 CV	33 PS (24 kW)	2,000 kg	1	4-speed manual	Light truck and bus/coach
SX	SX3	Petrol	6	3,180 cc	15/18 CV	53 PS (39 kW)	2,000–2,500 kg	2	4-speed manual	Light truck and bus/coach
SZ	SZ3	Petrol	6	3,180 cc	12 CV	53 PS (39 kW)	3 tonnes	1	4-speed manual	Light truck and bus/coach
TL		Petrol						1	4-speed manual	
TL	-	Petrol	4	6,082 cc	23 CV	60 PS (44 kW)	4 tonnes	1	4-speed manual	Truck and bus/coach
TL	-	Diesel	4	7,060 cc	27 CV	57 PS (42 kW)	4 tonnes	1	4-speed manual	Truck and bus/coach
TR			4					1	4-speed manual	
TR	TR	Petrol	4	6,082 cc	23 CV	60 PS (44 kW)	5.5 tonnes	1	4-speed manual	Truck
TR	TRD	Diesel	4	7,060 cc	27 CV	57 PS (42 kW)	5.5 tonnes	1	4-speed manual	Truck
TS			4						4-speed manual	Truck
TS	-	Petrol	4	6,082 cc	23 CV	60 PS (44 kW)	7.5 tonnes	2	4-speed manual	Truck
TS	-	Diesel	4	7,060 cc	27 CV	57 PS (42 kW)	7.5 tonnes	2	4-speed manual	Truck
TI	-	Petrol	6	9,120 cc	35 CV	100 PS (74 kW)	30–35 passenger seats (short); 35–40 passenger seats (long)	2	4-speed manual	Bus/coach
TI N	-	Petrol	4	6,082 cc	23 CV	60 PS (44 kW)	30–35 passenger seats (short); 35–40 passenger seats (long)	2	4-speed manual	Bus/coach
SY	-	Petrol	6	3,180 cc	12 CV	53 PS (39 kW)	6 tonnes (hauling)	1	4-speed manual	Tractor unit
TT								1	4-speed manual	Tractor unit
TT	-	Petrol	4	6,082 cc	23 CV	60 PS (44 kW)	12 tonnes (hauling)	1	4-speed manual	Tractor unit
TT	-	Diesel	4	7,060 cc	27 CV	57 PS (42 kW)	12 tonnes (hauling)	1	4-speed manual	Tractor unit

=== 1932 lineup ===
The Renault's commercial vehicle range for 1932 has about a dozen of different chassis configurations, with gross combined weight ratings of up to 14 tonnes (for rigid trucks) and 20 tonnes (for tractor units with towed cargo). The bus/coach bodywork variants can carry between 12 (OS model) and up to 45 passengers (TI model).

Model	Chassis code	Engines					Payload	Chassis lengths	Gearboxes	Type
Model	Chassis code	Fuel	C.	Displacement	Fiscal power	Power	Payload	Chassis lengths	Gearboxes	Type
Mona 4 (Note: The three first models were sold by Renault's passenger vehicle division.)	UY	Petrol	4	1,300 cc	7 CV	25 PS (18 kW)	500 kg	1	3-speed manual	Light van
Prima 4	YB	Petrol	4	2,120 cc	11 CV	35 PS (26 kW)	500 kg	1	3-speed manual	Light van
Viva 4	KZ	Petrol	4	2,120 cc	11 CV	35 PS (26 kW)	800 kg	2	3-speed manual	Light van
OS	OS4; OS5	Petrol	4	2,120 cc	11 CV	35 PS (26 kW)	1,300 kg	1	4-speed manual	Light truck and bus/coach
PR	PR4; PR5	Petrol	4	2,120 cc	11 CV	35 PS (26 kW)	2,000 kg	1	4-speed manual	Light truck and bus/coach
SX	SX4; SX5	Petrol	6	3,180 cc	15/18 CV	53 PS (39 kW)	2,000 kg	2	4-speed manual	Light truck and bus/coach
SZ	SZ4	Petrol	6	3,180 cc	12 CV	53 PS (39 kW)	3.5 tonnes	2	4-speed manual	Light truck and bus/coach
TI		Petrol							4-speed manual	
TI	TI 4	Petrol	4	6,082 cc	23 CV	69 PS (51 kW)	5 tonnes	3	4-speed manual	Truck and bus/coach
TI	TI 6	Petrol	6	9,120 cc	35 CV	100 PS (74 kW)	5 tonnes	3	4-speed manual	Truck and bus/coach
TI	TI D4	Diesel	4	7,060 cc	27 CV	57 PS (42 kW)	5 tonnes	3	4-speed manual	Truck and bus/coach
TI	TI D6	Diesel	6	10,590 cc	40 CV	87 PS (64 kW)	5 tonnes	3	4-speed manual	Truck and bus/coach
UD									4-speed manual	
UD	UD 4	Petrol	4	6,082 cc	23 CV	69 PS (51 kW)	7.5 tonnes	1	4-speed manual	Truck
UD	UD 6	Petrol	6	9,120 cc	35 CV	100 PS (74 kW)	7.5 tonnes	1	4-speed manual	Truck
UD	UD D4	Diesel	4	7,060 cc	27 CV	57 PS (42 kW)	7.5 tonnes	1	4-speed manual	Truck
UD	UD D6	Diesel	6	10,590 cc	40 CV	87 PS (64 kW)	7.5 tonnes	1	4-speed manual	Truck
TS									4-speed manual	Truck
TS	TSE; TS	Petrol	4	6,082 cc	23 CV	69 PS (51 kW)	9.5 tonnes	2	4-speed manual	Truck
TS	TSE D4; TS D4	Diesel	4	7,060 cc	27 CV	57 PS (42 kW)	9.5 tonnes	2	4-speed manual	Truck
VT
VT	VT 6	Petrol	6	9,120 cc	40 CV	100 PS (74 kW)	12 tonnes	1	5-speed manual	6x2 truck
VT	VT D6	Diesel	6	10,590 cc	40 CV	87 PS (64 kW)	12 tonnes	1	5-speed manual	6x2 truck
SY	-	Petrol	6	3,180 cc	12 CV	53 PS (39 kW)	6 tonnes (hauling)	1	4-speed manual	Tractor unit
TT								1		Tractor unit
TT	TT 4	Petrol	4	6,082 cc	23 CV	69 PS (51 kW)	10–15 tonnes (hauling)	1	5-speed manual	Tractor unit
TT	TT 6	Petrol	6	9,120 cc	35 CV	100 PS (74 kW)	10–15 tonnes (hauling)	1	5-speed manual	Tractor unit
TT	TT D4	Diesel	4	7,060 cc	27 CV	57 PS (42 kW)	10–15 tonnes (hauling)	1	5-speed manual	Tractor unit
TT	TT D6	Diesel	6	10,590 cc	40 CV	87 PS (64 kW)	10–15 tonnes (hauling)	1	5-speed manual	Tractor unit

=== 1933 lineup ===
The Renault's commercial vehicle range for 1933 has the same maximum gross combined weight ratings of the previous range. Some bus/coach variants got improvements on chassis and suspension. (Note: For the passenger car chassis with commercial version, see Renault Monaquatre.)

Model	Chassis code	Engines					Payload	Chassis lengths	Gearboxes	Type
Model	Chassis code	Fuel	C.	Displacement	Fiscal power	Power	Payload	Chassis lengths	Gearboxes	Type
YP	YPB	Petrol	4	1,463 cc	8 CV	32 PS (24 kW)	750 kg	1	3-speed manual	Light van
KZ	KZB (KZ12)	Petrol	4	2,120 cc	11 CV	35 PS (26 kW)	750 kg	1	3-speed manual	Light van
OS	OSB	Petrol	4	2,120 cc	11 CV	35 PS (26 kW)	1,300 kg	1	4-speed manual	Light truck and bus/coach
PR	PRB	Petrol	4	2,120 cc	11 CV	35 PS (26 kW)	2,000 kg	1	4-speed manual	Light truck and bus/coach
SX	SXB	Petrol	6	3,180 cc	15/18 CV	53 PS (39 kW)	2,000 kg	2	4-speed manual	Light truck and bus/coach
YF		Petrol	6	3,180 cc		53 PS (39 kW)		2	4-speed manual	Light truck and bus/coach
YF	YFAB	Petrol	4	4,050 cc	15 CV	65 PS (48 kW)	3.5 tonnes	2	4-speed manual	Light truck and bus/coach
YF	YFDB	Diesel	4	4,345 cc	12 CV	45 PS (33 kW)	3.5 tonnes	2	4-speed manual	Light truck and bus/coach
TI			4							Light truck and bus/coach
TI	TI 4 B	Petrol	4	6,082 cc	23 CV	69 PS (51 kW)	5.5 tonnes	3	5-speed manual	Truck and bus/coach
TI	TI 6 B	Petrol	6	7,983 cc	30 CV	105 PS (77 kW)	5.5 tonnes	3	5-speed manual	Truck and bus/coach
TI	TI D4 B	Diesel	4	7,060 cc	19 CV	57 PS (42 kW)	5.5 tonnes	3	5-speed manual	Truck and bus/coach
TI	TI D6 B	Diesel	6	10,590 cc	28 CV	87 PS (64 kW)	5.5 tonnes	3	5-speed manual	Truck and bus/coach
UD									5-speed manual	
UD	UD 4 B	Petrol	4	6,082 cc	23 CV	69 PS (51 kW)	7.5 tonnes	1	5-speed manual	Truck
UD	UD 6 B	Petrol	6	7,983 cc	30 CV	105 PS (77 kW)	7.5 tonnes	1	5-speed manual	Truck
UD	UD D4 AB	Diesel	4	7,060 cc	19 CV	57 PS (42 kW)	7.5 tonnes	1	5-speed manual	Bus/coach and delivery vehicle
UD	UD D6 B	Diesel	6	10,590 cc	28 CV	87 PS (64 kW)	7.5 tonnes	1	5-speed manual	Truck
VT								1	5-speed manual	
VT	VT 6 AB	Petrol	6	7,983 cc	30 CV	105 PS (77 kW)	12 tonnes	1	5-speed manual	6x2 truck
VT	VT D6 B	Diesel	6	10,590 cc	28 CV	87 PS (64 kW)	12 tonnes	1	5-speed manual	6x2 truck
YG								1	5-speed manual	
YG	YGAB	Petrol	4	4,050 cc	15 CV	65 PS (48 kW)	6 tonnes (hauling)	1	5-speed manual	Tractor unit
YG	YGDB	Diesel	4	4,345 cc	12 CV	45 PS (33 kW)	6 tonnes (hauling)	1	5-speed manual	Tractor unit
TT			4					1	5-speed manual	Tractor unit
TT	TT 4	Petrol	4	6,082 cc	23 CV	69 PS (51 kW)	10–15 tonnes (hauling)	1	5-speed manual	Tractor unit
TT	TT 6 A	Petrol	6	7,983 cc	30 CV	105 PS (77 kW)	10–15 tonnes (hauling)	1	5-speed manual	Tractor unit
TT	TT D4	Diesel	4	7,060 cc	19 CV	57 PS (42 kW)	10–15 tonnes (hauling)	1	5-speed manual	Tractor unit
TT	TT D6	Diesel	6	10,590 cc	28 CV	87 PS (64 kW)	10–15 tonnes (hauling)	1	5-speed manual	Tractor unit

=== 1935 lineup ===
The Renault's commercial vehicle range for 1935 has about twenty three different chassis configurations, with a gross combined weight rating of up 20 tonnes. The bus/coach bodywork variants can carry between 14 (OS model) and up to 36 passengers (ZP model). Various models' chassis were modified to comply with the French law.

Model	Chassis code	Engines				Payload	Chassis lengths	Gearboxes	Type
Model	Chassis code	Fuel	C.	Displacement	Power	Payload	Chassis lengths	Gearboxes	Type
YN	YN1	Petrol	4	1,463 cc	34 PS (25 kW)	450 kg	1	3-speed manual	Light van
YP	YPE	Petrol	4	1,463 cc	34 PS (25 kW)	750 kg	1	3-speed manual	Light van
KZ	KZE	Petrol	4	2,120 cc	43 PS (32 kW)	750 kg	1	3-speed manual	Light van
OS	OSC	Petrol	4	2,120 cc	43 PS (32 kW)	1,200 kg	1	4-speed manual	Light truck and bus/coach
ZJ	ZJC	Petrol	4	2,120 cc	43 PS (32 kW)	2,000 kg	1	4-speed manual	Light truck and bus/coach
ZY		Petrol	4					4-speed manual	Light truck and bus/coach
ZY	ZYAE	Petrol	4	4,050 cc	77 PS (57 kW)	2.5 tonnes	2	4-speed manual	Light truck and bus/coach
ZY	ZYDE	Diesel	4	4,345 cc	47 PS (35 kW)	2.5 tonnes	2	4-speed manual	Light truck
YF			4				2	4-speed manual	
YF	YFAE	Petrol	4	4,050 cc	77 PS (57 kW)	3.5 tonnes	2	4-speed manual	Truck and bus/coach
YF	YFDE	Diesel	4	4,345 cc	47 PS (35 kW)	3.5 tonnes	2	4-speed manual	Truck
ABF			4				2	4-speed manual	
ABF	ABF	Petrol	4	5,900 cc	85 PS (63 kW)	4.5–5 tonnes	2	4-speed manual	Forward control truck
ABF	ABFD	Diesel	4	8,350 cc	85 PS (63 kW)	4.5–5 tonnes	2	4-speed manual	Forward control truck
TI			4		85 PS (63 kW)		2		
TI	TI 4 AE	Petrol	4	5,900 cc	85 PS (63 kW)	5.5 tonnes	2	5-speed manual	Truck
TI	TI 4 DE	Diesel	4	8,350 cc	85 PS (63 kW)	5.5 tonnes	2	5-speed manual	Truck
UD							2	5-speed manual	Truck
UD	UD 6 AE	Petrol	6	7,983 cc	112 PS (82 kW)	7.5 tonnes	2	5-speed manual	Truck
UD	UD 6 DE	Diesel	6	12,525 cc	130 PS (96 kW)	7.5 tonnes	2	5-speed manual	Truck
VT	VT D6 DD	Diesel	6	12,525 cc	130 PS (96 kW)	12 tonnes	1	5-speed manual	6x2 truck
ZF	ZF 6 DD	Diesel	6	12,525 cc	130 PS (96 kW)	15 tonnes	1	5-speed manual	6x2 truck
YG							1		
YG	YGAD	Petrol	4	4,050 cc	77 PS (57 kW)	6 tonnes (hauling)	1	4-speed manual	Tractor unit
YG	YGDD	Diesel	4	4,345 cc	47 PS (35 kW)	6 tonnes (hauling)	1	4-speed manual	Tractor unit
ABG			4				1	4-speed manual	
ABG	ABG	Petrol	4	5,900 cc	85 PS (63 kW)	8–10 tonnes (hauling)	1	4-speed manual	Forward control tractor unit
ABG	ABGD	Diesel	4	8,350 cc	85 PS (63 kW)	8–10 tonnes (hauling)	1	4-speed manual	Forward control tractor unit
TT	TT D6	Diesel	6	12,525 cc	130 PS (96 kW)	15 tonnes (hauling)	1	5-speed manual	Tractor unit
TI a			6				1	5-speed manual	
TI a	TI 6 AE	Petrol	6	7,983 cc	112 PS (82 kW)	22 passenger seats	1	5-speed manual	Bus/coach
TI a	TI 6 DE	Diesel	6	12,525 cc	130 PS (96 kW)	22 passenger seats	1	5-speed manual	Bus/coach
ZI	-	Petrol	4	5,900 cc	85 PS (63 kW)–99 PS (73 kW)	26 passenger seats	1	4-speed manual	Bus/coach
ZP	-	Petrol	4	5,900 cc	85 PS (63 kW)–99 PS (73 kW)	23–28 passenger seats (short); 31–36 passenger seats (long)	2	4-speed manual	Forward control bus/coach
