= Fiat 6601 =

4x4 truck

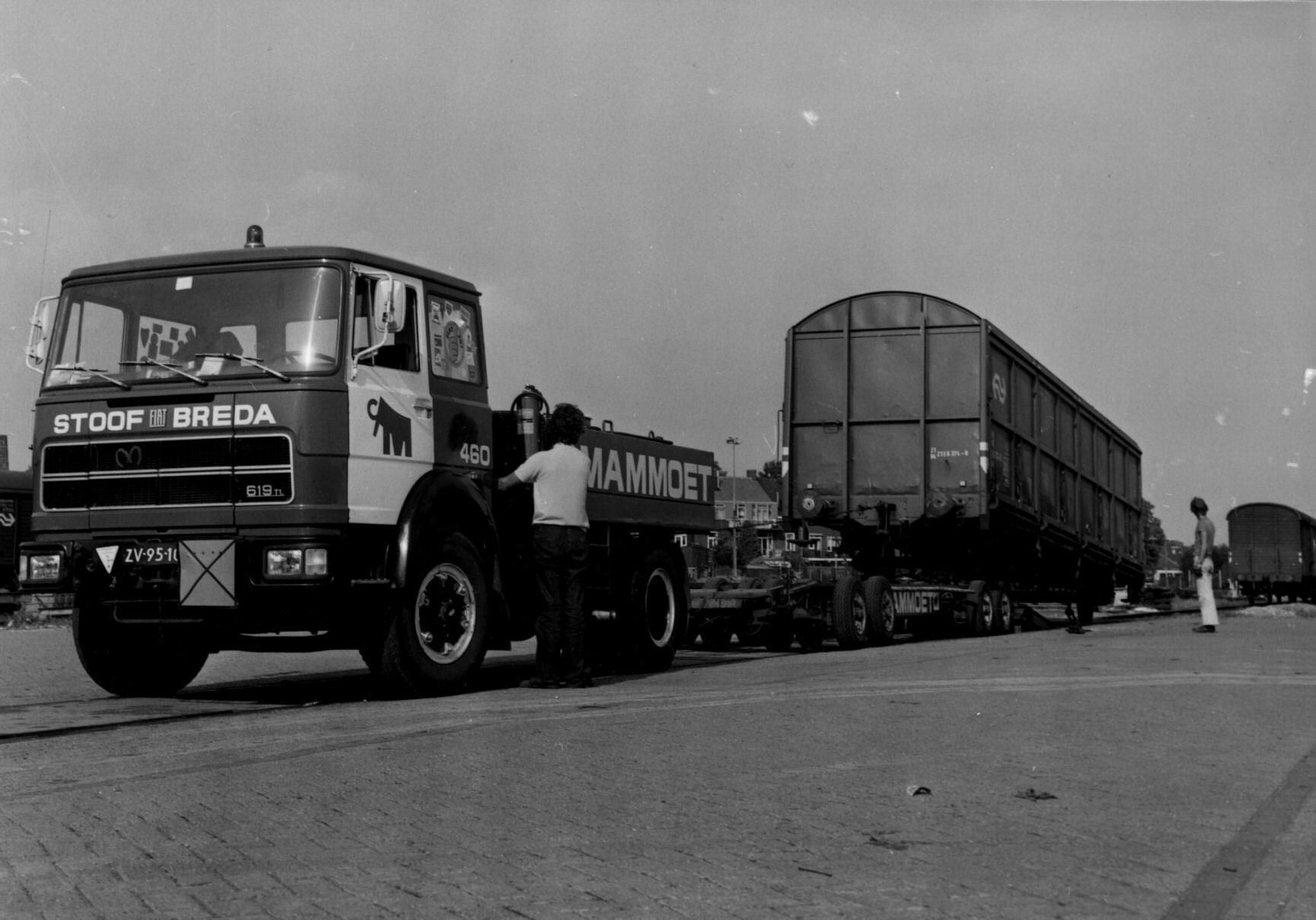

The Fiat 6601 CM 52 is a 4x4 truck designed for military use, used for the transportation of foot soldiers and equipment. It was designed by Fiat S.p.A's industrial vehicles division in 1952, following the Second World War.
