= Peugeot Type 1525 =

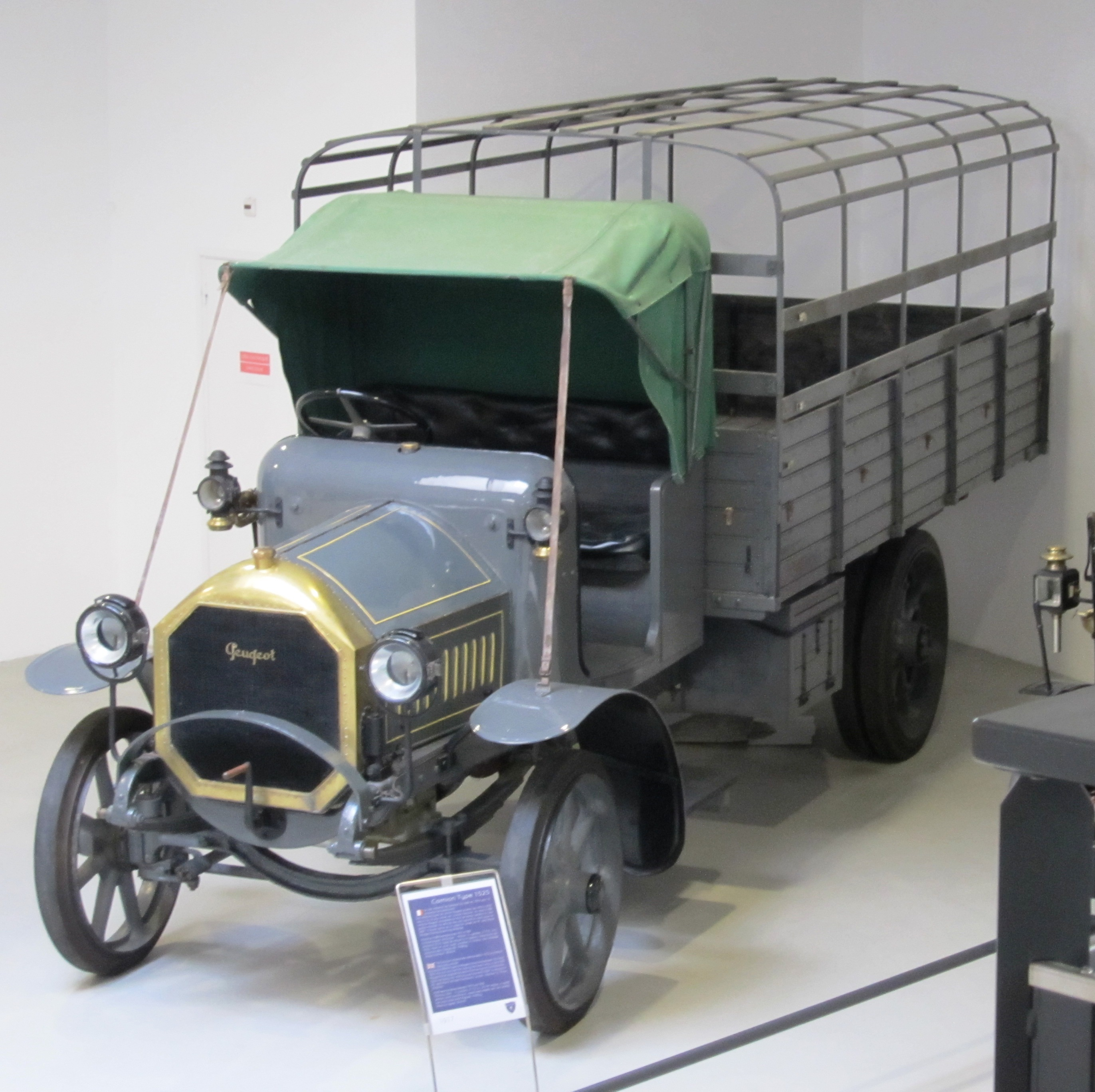

Overview
- Manufacturer: Peugeot
- Production: Sochaux; 1917-1920; 4,084 units

Body and chassis
- Class: Truck
- Body style: Truck
- Layout: FR layout

The Peugeot Type 1525 was a truck produced by Peugeot at their recently created Sochaux plant between 1917 and 1920.

The industrial site at Sochaux was established in 1912. Today it is the company's lead plant in Europe, but it was originally intended for the production of commercial vehicles. Before and during the war years, between 1913 and 1918, various different types of truck were produced, mostly for the French army. In total around 6,000 Peugeot trucks supplied the front at Verdun during the First World War.

The type 1525 Truck, first produced in 1917, featured a 4-cylinder 4,712 cc engine with a claimed maximum power output of 22 hp. The maximum speed was given as 30 km/h (19 mph). The front-mounted engine drove the rear wheels via a four-speed gear box and a rotating steel drive-shaft. The truck came with steel wheels, which were doubled at the back, and shod with solid rubber tyres. The maximum usable load weight was reckoned at 4,000 kg.

Between 1917 and 1920 the company produced 4,084 Type 1525 trucks.
