= BAZ-6909 =

Russian truck chassis

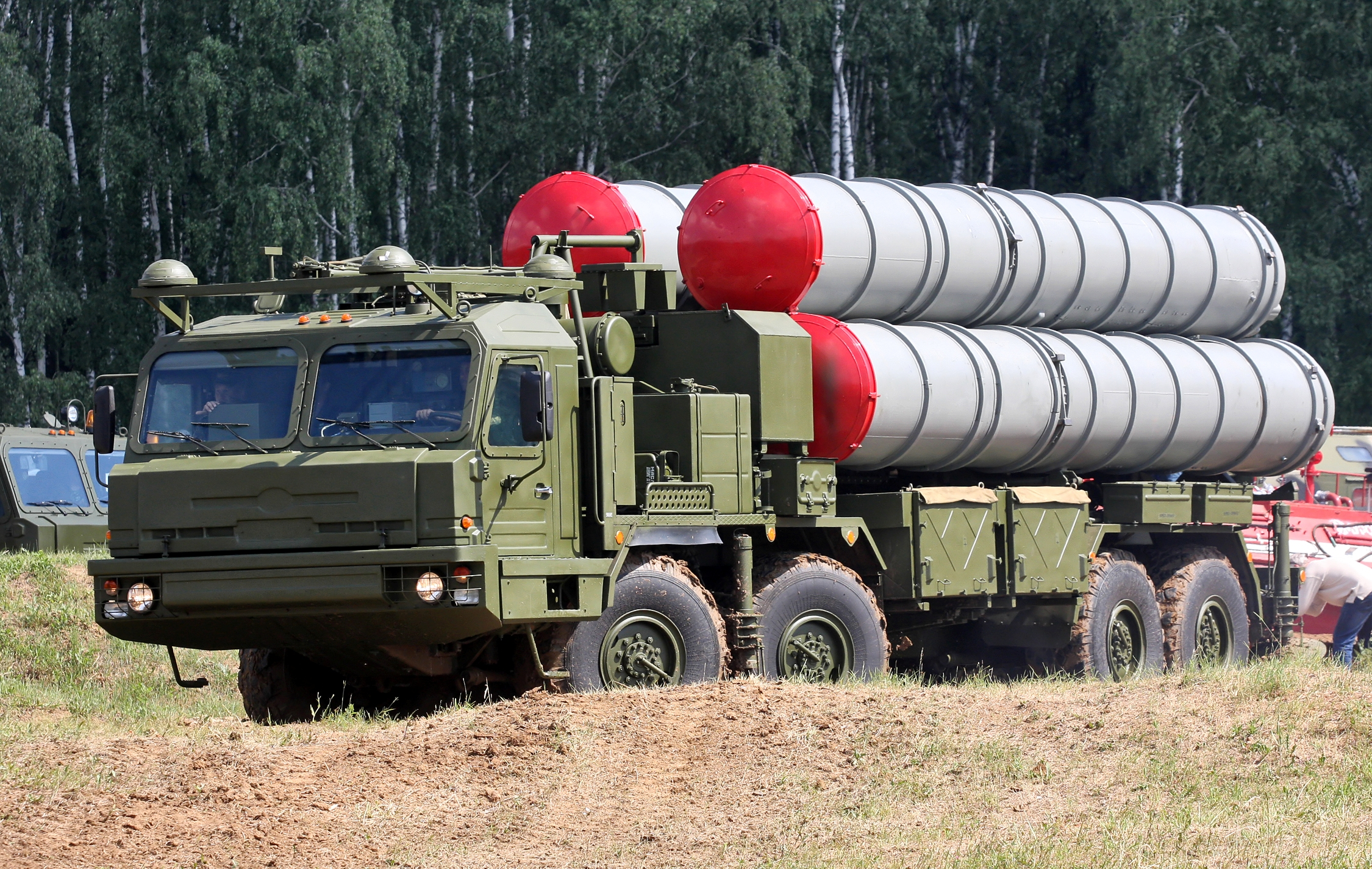
- BAZ-6909-022 with S-400 missile system

Overview
- Manufacturer: Bryansk Automobile Plant
- Production: 1990-present

Body and chassis
- Class: Artillery tractor Missile vehicle

Powertrain
- Engine: YaMZ; YaMZ-8401.10-14 V12 diesel engine
- Range: 1000 km

Dimensions
- Length: 11,300 mm (444.9 in)
- Width: 2,750 mm (108.3 in)
- Height: 2,850 mm (112.2 in)
- Curb weight: 22,000 kg (48,502 lb)

The BAZ-6909 is a Russian artillery tractor and missile vehicle that was developed as a successor to the MAZ-537 and MAZ-7310 by Bryansk Automobile Plant. It can haul semi-trailers and loads with mass of 13-21 metric tons, both on and off-road.

It uses a YaMZ-8424.10 diesel engine with 500 hp.

== Variants ==
- BAZ-6402 6x6 tractor truck;
- BAZ-69092 6x6 special wheeled chassis;
- BAZ-6306 8x8 artillery tractor;
- BAZ-6403 8x8 tractor truck;
- BAZ-6910 8x8 shelter carrier;
- REM-KS, 8x8 repair and recovery vehicle;
- BAZ-69096 10x10 special wheeled chassis;
- BAZ-69099 12x12 special wheeled chassis.

== See also ==
- KZKT-7428
- MAZ-543
- ZIL-135
