= Kurgan Wheel Tractor Plant =

Former Russian specialized vehicle manufacturer

OJSC "Rusich" - D.M. Karbyshev Kurgan Wheel Tractor Plant
- Type: Open joint-stock company
- Industry: Mechanical engineering
- Founded: 1950
- Defunct: 2011
- Headquarters: Kurgan, KGN, Russia
- Products: tractors
- Number of employees: approx. 11,000 (1970s-1980s)
- Website: http://www.rusich-kzkt.ru/

The Kurgan Wheel Tractor Plant named after D. Karbyshev (JSC "Rusich", Russian: Курганский завод колёсных тягачей имени Д. М. Карбышева (ОАО «Русич»)) was a manufacturer of special heavy-duty vehicles. It operated from 1950 to 2011 and was located in Kurgan.

The plant produced vehicles, special chassis, truck tractors, and semi-trailers used by the Russian Ministry of Defense and oil and gas companies. In addition, it produced heavy-duty ballast tractors used to tow aircraft weighing up to 200 tons along airfields.

On 28 April 2011, the factory was declared bankrupt by the Arbitration Court of the Kurgan Oblast. The enterprise's production facilities were liquidated and its real estate was partially repurposed.

== History ==
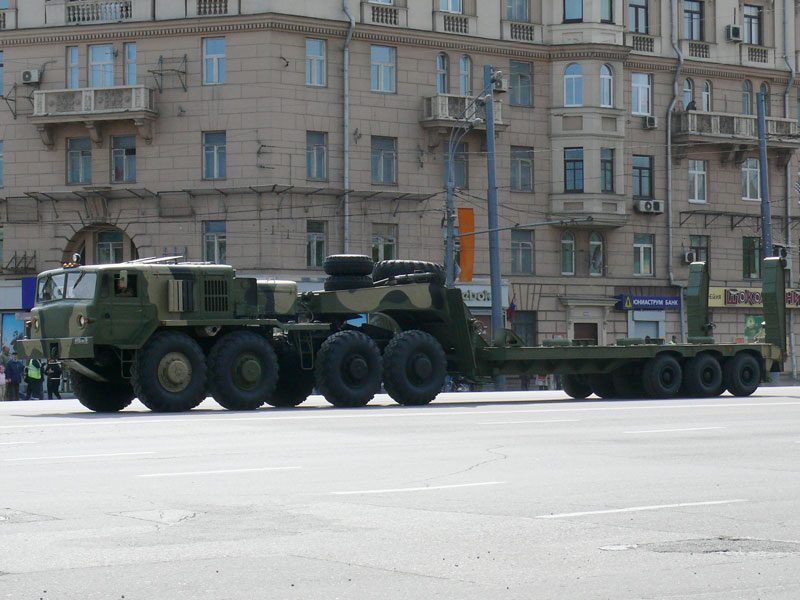
MAZ-537 tractor at the 2008 Moscow Victory Day Parade

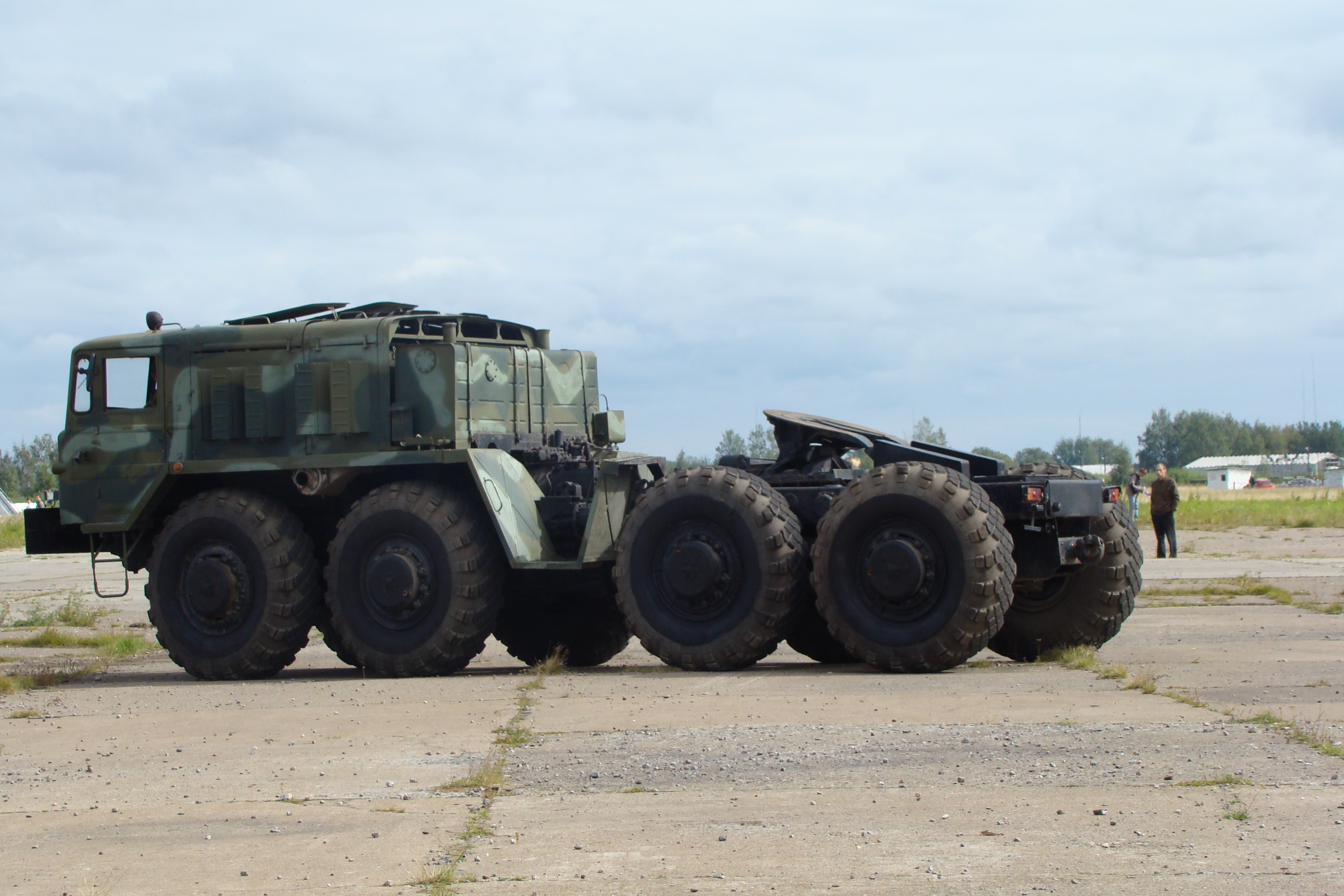
MAZ-537 tractor

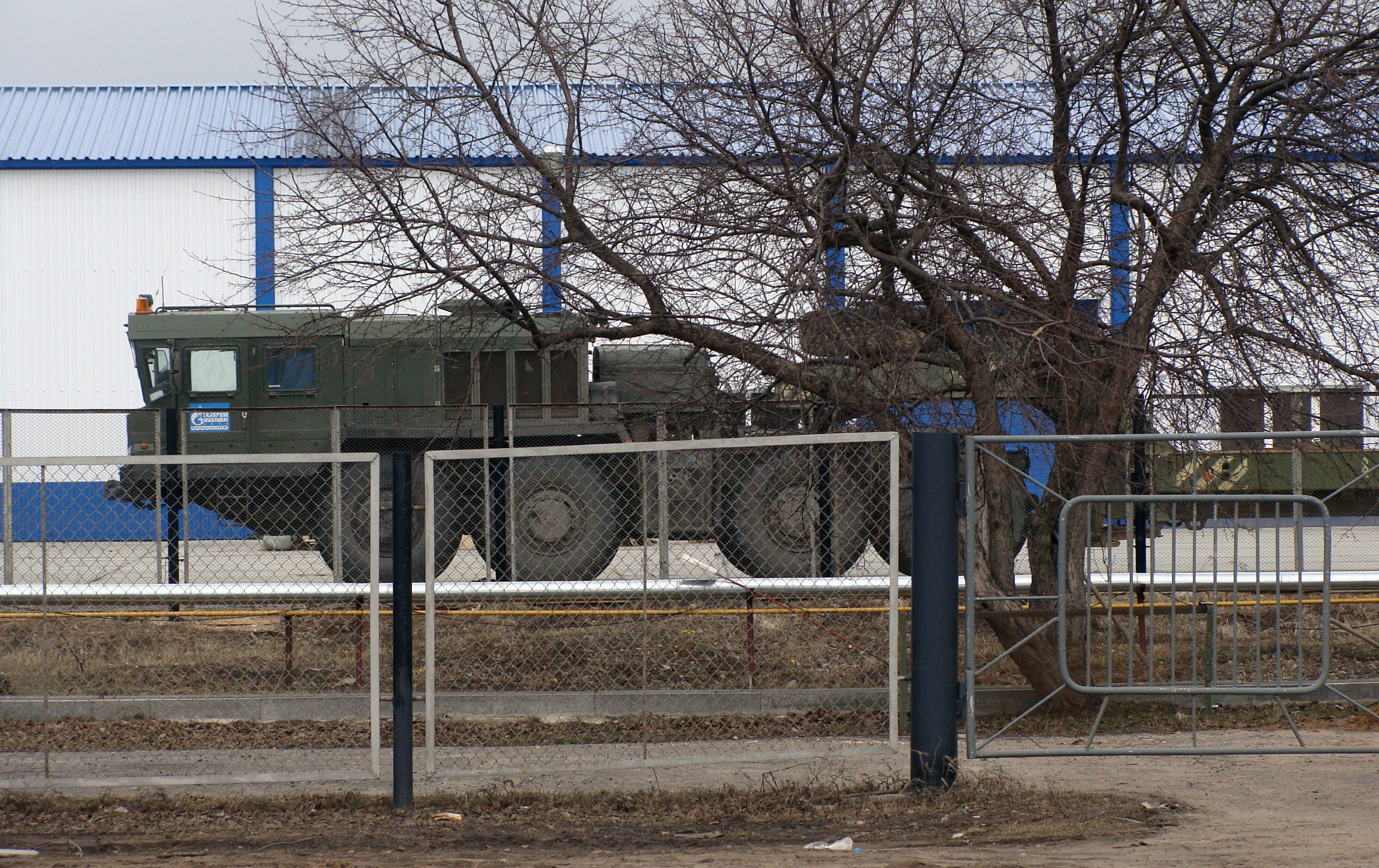
KZKT-7428

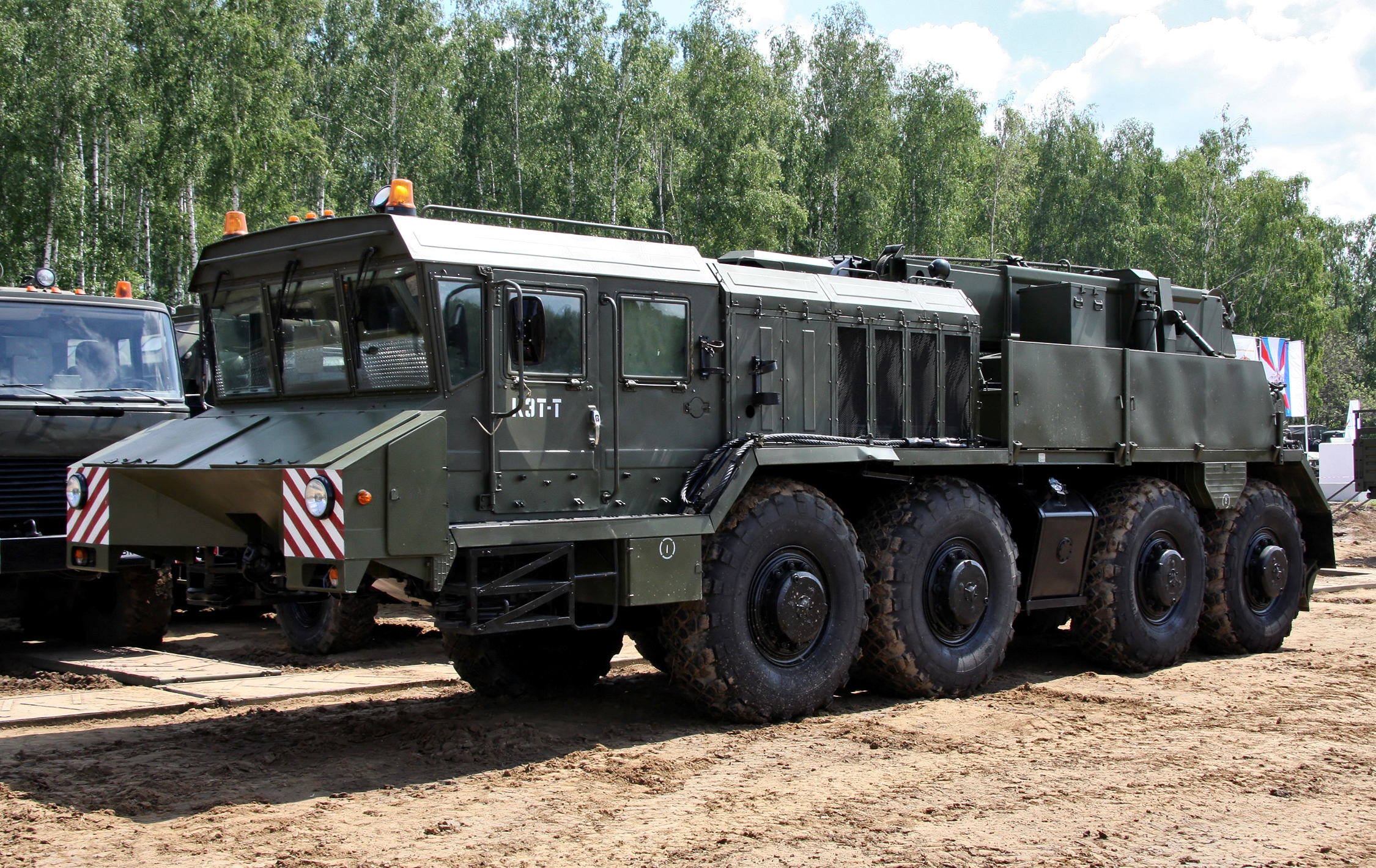
The wheeled recovery vehicle KET-T on KZKT-74281-012-chassis

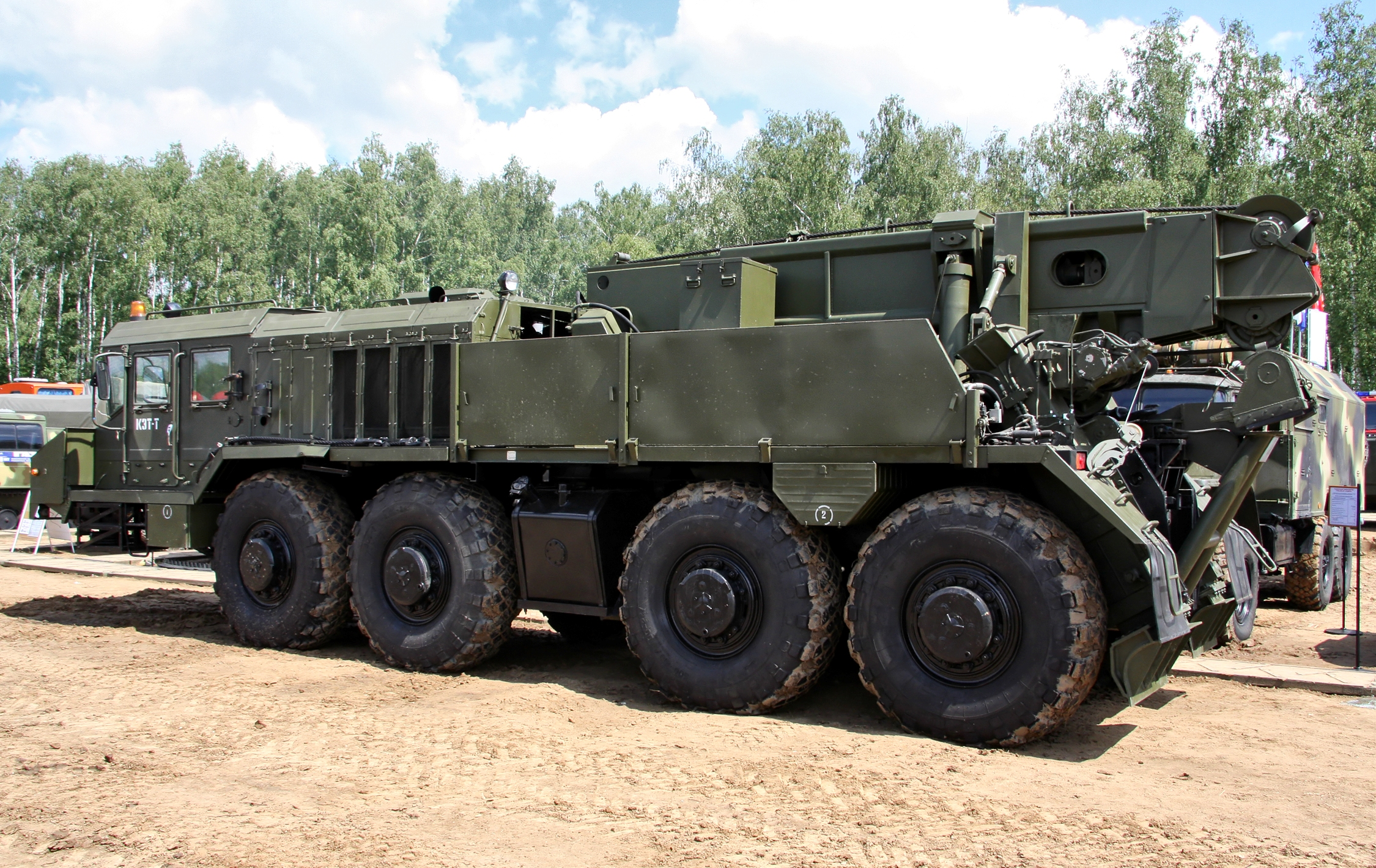
The wheeled recovery vehicle KET-T on KZKT-74281-012-chassis

The plant was founded on 1 April 1950, in Kurgan on the basis of Uralselmash. At the time the manufacturer specialized on producing balers, harrows, silage cutters, threshers, etc. In the late 1950s, due to the increased need of the national economy for heavy machines, the plant was repurposed to produce wheel tractors. It was renamed Kurgan Wheel Tractor Plant (KZKT) by the Order of the Minister of the automotive and tractor industry on 11 June 1966.

In the 1970s and 80s, it employed about 11,000 people, that were specialists in 219 professions. The pride of the collective was Hero of Socialist Labor Yuri Nabatnikov. Mass edition factory newspaper "Factory Life" was issued. KZKT had a Palace of Culture, Sports Palace, Stadium and "Dolphin" swimming pool.

In 1981 the plant was awarded the Order of the Red Banner of Labor.

On July 10, 1993, JSC "Rusich" — "D.M. Karbyshev Kurgan Wheel Tractor Plant" was registered. The volume of government procurement in 1991 dropped from 91% down to a level of 4.5%. Due to the lack of funds oil and gas companies rejected ordered vehicles, resulting in 286 unsold vehicles accumulated in warehouses. The volume of production in 1993 decreased by 34.2%.

== Activities, products and services ==
Activity: KZKT 8×8 automobile-tractors, full mass of a towing semi-trailer up to 100 tonnes, ballast tractors for towing trailers weighing up to 80 tonnes and aircraft weighing up to 200 tons; semi-trailers for transporting loads up to 80 tonnes, and differentials for UAZ cars.

Goods and Services: trucks and tractors, lorries, tractors for semi-trailers, trailers for trucks and tractors, road semi-trailers, Machine elements, components and spare parts for transmissions of automobiles and motor vehicles, Differential devices and components of automobiles and motor vehicles, Airport and aerodrome equipment, ground aircraft-towing vehicles for airports (tugs).

The plant had its own foundry.

== Bankruptcy ==
In the post-Soviet period, the company repeatedly changed owners several times and had undergone the bankruptcy procedure several times.

Back in 2010, the Arbitral Court of Kurgan Oblast received a statement from OAO "EnergoKurgan" that demanded recognition of the financial bankruptcy of JSC "Rusich" — "D.M. Karbyshev Kurgan Wheel Tractor Plant". A court decision from February 24, 2010, concerning JSC "Rusich" — KZKT appointed external supervision for a period of 18 months, Alexander Maslakov was approved as the external manager. The external manager concluded that it was impossible to fulfill the external supervision plan before the deadline set by a court decision. In this regard, on March 17, 2011, Alexander Maslakov appealed to the Arbitral Court for early termination of external supervision procedures and the transition to bankruptcy proceedings. On April 28, 2011, the Arbitral Court of Kurgan Oblast declared JSC "Rusich" — "D.M. Karbyshev Kurgan Wheel Tractor Plant" bankrupt. According to the external supervision plan, a portion of the property was to be sold through public auction.

As a result of the auction, organized by LLC "YuKO", winning bidders in the sale of lots were recognized as follows:

- Limited Liability Company "Group ESE" (300,965,412.96 rubles)
- Limited Liability Company "Titan" (98,019,002.10 rubles)
- Andrey Demin (38,916,483.40 rubles)
- Limited Liability Company "The Foundry" (24,203,145.17 rubles)
- Limited Liability Company "Leasing Invest" (18,500,500.80 rubles)
- Open Joint Stock Company "Kurgan Generation Company" (12,626,000.00 rubles)
- Cassina Julia Vitalievna (11,487,600.00 rubles)
- Limited Liability Company "Wave - ZHILSERVIS number 4" (6,768,000.00 rubles)
- SP Gennady Polikarpov (3,776,400.00 rubles)
- Pazderin Pavel V. (1,400,700.00 rubles)
- SP R. Roman O. (1,213,800.00 rubles)
- Limited Liability Company "Uralmetsnab" (1,009,800.00 rubles)

== Products ==
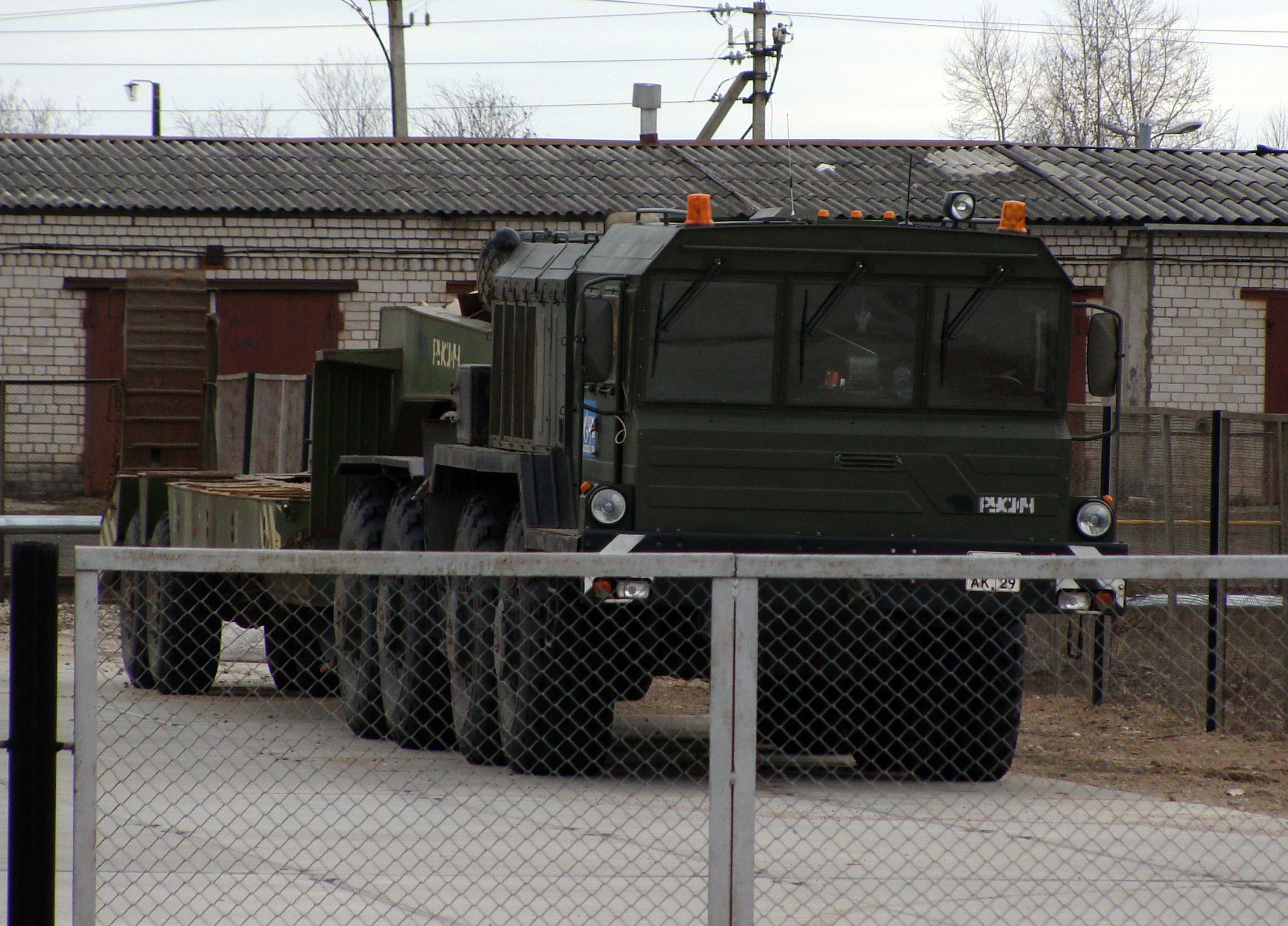
Tractor Rusich: KZKT-7428

- BTR-60
- MAZ-535 (1961–1963)
- Tractor MAZ-537 (1963–1990)
- Tractor KZKT-545
- Tractor KZKT-7428 "Rusich" (1990–2011, developed by the Plant Design Bureau)
- Special wheeled chassis KZKT-8005 (1990s–2011)

== Administration ==
Factory directors were:

- 1950-1952 A.D. Sabel'nikov
- 1952-1961 Konov A.I.
- 1961-1971 Ketov, George Martiyanovich
- 1971-1984 Kondratyev, Grigory
- 1984-1986 Belozerov, Leonid G.
- 1986-1989 Pavlov, Pavel
- 1989-1995 Nechaev, Vladimir V.
- 1996 since Cherva, Boris Maksimovic

external manager

- Maslakov, Alexander

Director of "KZKT"

- From February to March 2008 Tyazhelnikov, Vyacheslav
- From February 2010 Zamyatkin, Yuri

Director of "Forge Factory" Rusich "

- From March 2008 to February 2010 Tyazhelnikov, Vyacheslav

== Literature ==
- A.S. Sevost'yanov. "The "Hurricanes" are born here" - Chelyabinsk, 1985 (А.С. Севостьянов «Здесь рождаются «Ураганы» — Челябинск, 1985)
