= MAZ-537 =

Soviet artillery tractor

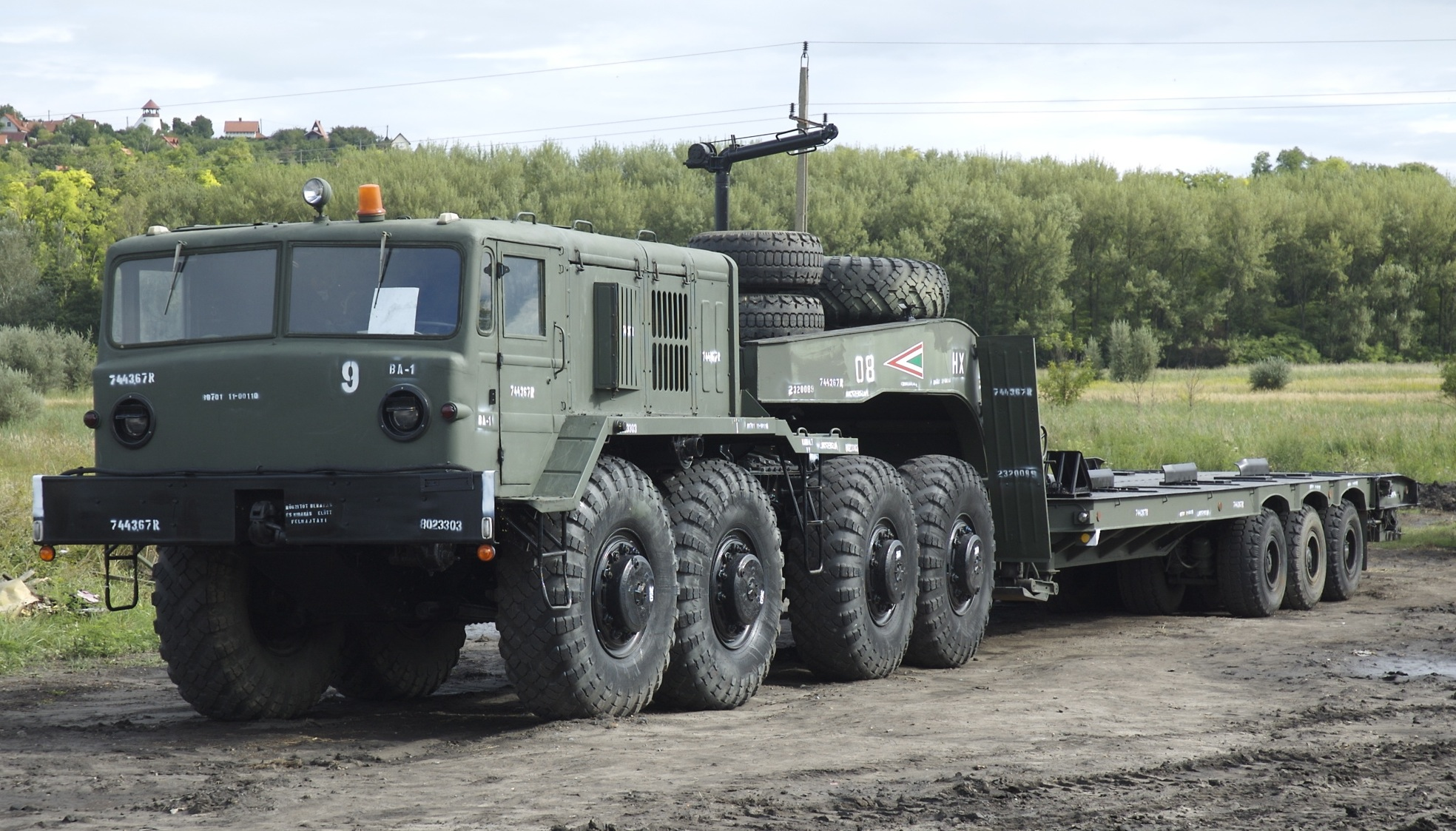

Overview
- Manufacturer: MAZ (1959–1965); KZKT (1963–1990)
- Also called: KZKT-537
- Production: 1959–1990
- Assembly: Minsk (1959–1965); Kurgan (1963–1990)

Body and chassis
- Body style: tractor
- Layout: Mid-engine, eight-wheel-drive layout

Powertrain
- Engine: 38.8L D-12A-525A V12 525HP diesel
- Transmission: 3-speed hydromechanical transmission

Dimensions
- Wheelbase: 1,700 mm (66.9 in) + 2,650 mm (104.3 in) + 1,700 mm (66.9 in)
- Length: 8,960 mm (352.8 in)
- Width: 2,885 mm (113.6 in)
- Height: 2,880 mm (113.4 in) (by cab); 3,100 mm (122.0 in) (by turning the spotlight)
- Curb weight: 21,600 kg (47,620 lb)

Chronology
- Predecessor: MAZ-535
- Successor: MAZ-543; KZKT-7428

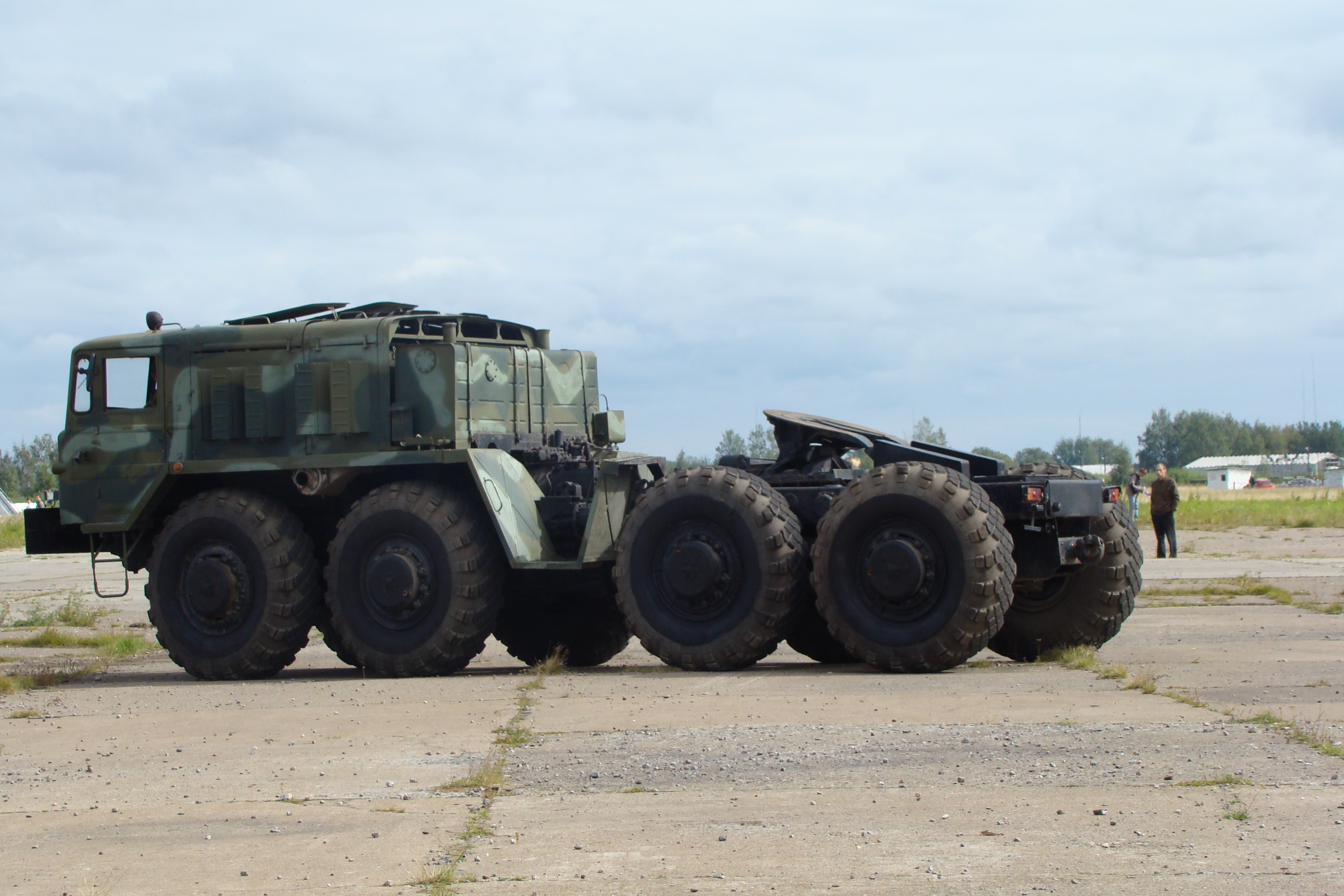

The MAZ-537 is a 12-cylinder diesel engine-powered military truck artillery tractor, originally designed for loads up to 50 tons (using semitrailers such as the ChMZAP-9990 or ChMZAP-5247G, for example) with later versions providing a maximum load of 65 tons. It was manufactured by the Minsk Automobile Plant (from 1959 to 1965) and the Kurgan Wheel Tractor Plant from 1963 until halt of production in 1990.

The metal cab of the MAZ-537 provides space for the driver and three passengers for a total of four occupants, has two access doors on the side and a roof hatch, and is equipped with additional engine-independent heating. The 537G modification is characterized by the addition of a winch to facilitate loading and unloading, as well as enabling self-extraction when stalled in adverse terrain (like mud). The working cable length of the winch is 100 meters, and the winch is able to provide 15 tons of traction.

The vehicle is powered by a 12-cylinder D-12A-525A diesel engine located directly behind the cab which provides preheating as well. The drivetrain of the MAZ-537 consists of a hydrodynamic transmission transferring power to the two front axles over a torque converter and a planetary three-stage gearbox with assisted steering (power steering) gear.

The MAZ-537 has been widely used in both military roles (as, for example, artillery tractor trailer (pulling rocket or (ballistic) missile launchers), tank transporter, and airfield tractor) and in the civilian sphere as heavy tractor trailers, tractor ballast (or secondary unit) for carrying extra heavy loads, and in oil and gas fields.

== Modifications ==
- MAZ-537G: equipped with a winch.
- MAZ-537D: with external electrical (AC) generator.
- MAZ-537E: increased load handling to total semitrailer weight of up to 65 tons.
- MAZ-537A: additional flatbed compartment providing an on-board carrying capacity of 15 tons with a concurrent maximum total semitrailer load of 65 tons (only on hardened roads); total maximum length increased to 30m.
- MAZ-537K: specifically adapted for the installation of crane equipment.

== See also ==
- ZIL-135

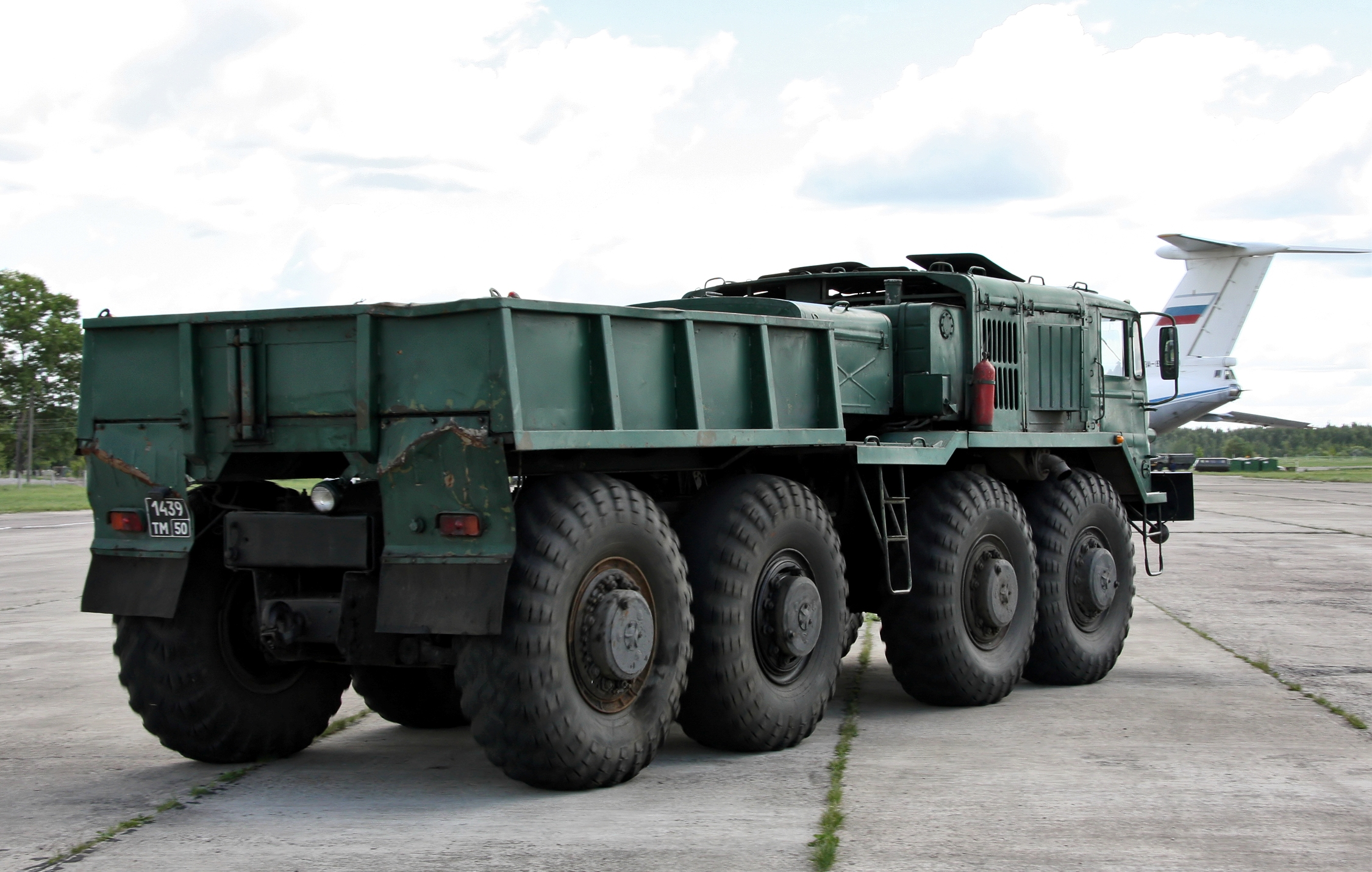
ballast tractor at the Migalovo Air Force base in Tver Oblast
