= Bryansk Automobile Plant =

Russian truck manufacturer

Coordinates: 53°19′14″N 34°15′18″E

JSC Bryansk Automobile Plant
- BAZ logo
- Trade name: JSC BAZ
- Native name: Акционерное общество "Брянский автомобильный завод"
- Type: Closed corporation
- Industry: Automotive; Defence
- Founded: 1958, Bryansk
- Headquarters: Bryansk, BRY, Russia
- Key people: CEO Mikhail Steklov
- Products: Off-road Heavy trucks
- Revenue: $41.6 million (2017)
- Operating income: $1.36 million (2017)
- Net income: $139,880 (2017)
- Total assets: $45.2 million (2017)
- Total equity: $21.6 million (2017)
- Parent: Almaz-Antey
- Website: BAZ website

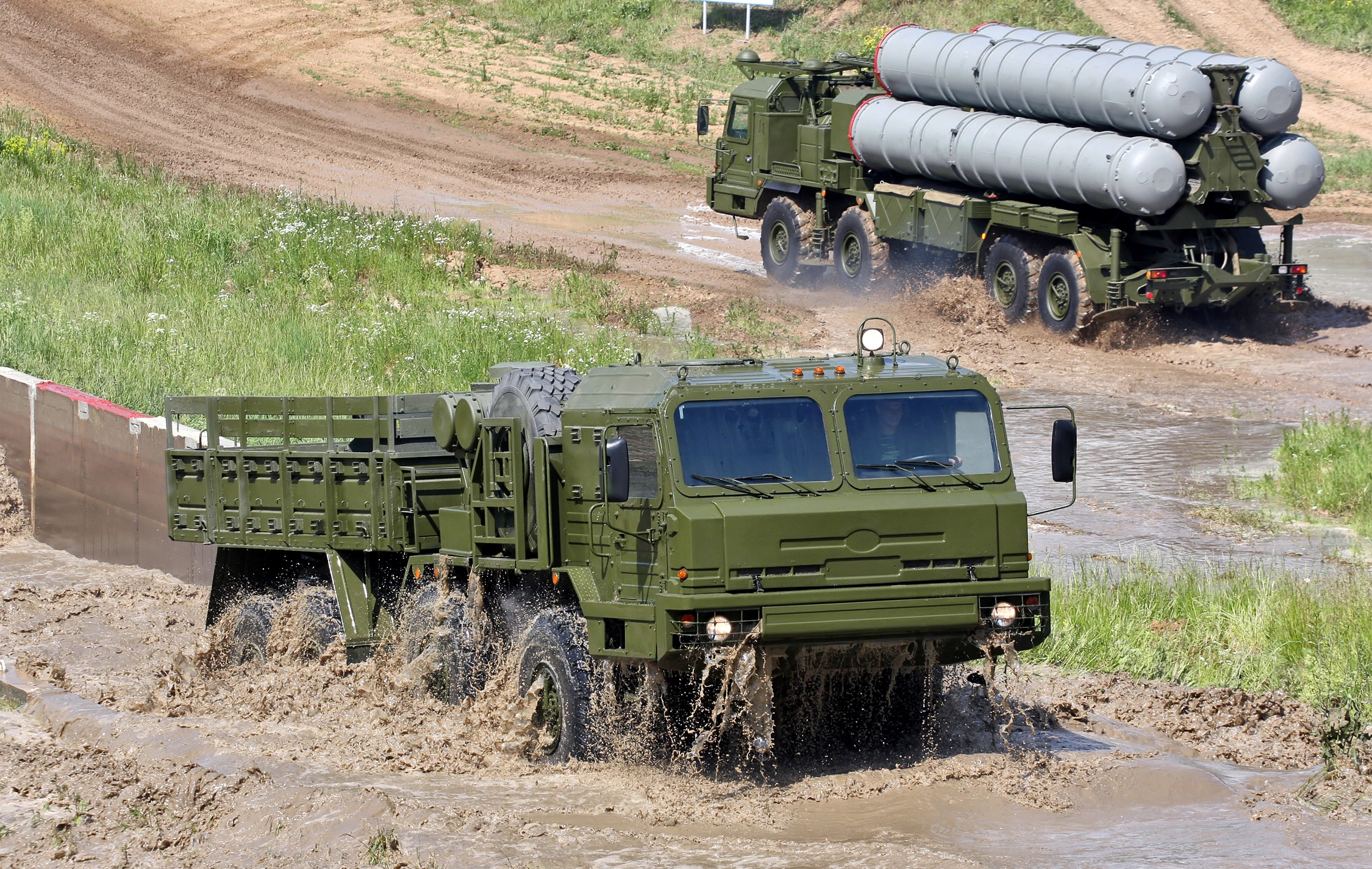
The BAZ-69092-021 towing vehicle for the 5I57A power generator and the 63T6A power converter for the S-400 (missile) system.

Bryansk Automobile Plant (BAZ; Russian: Брянский автомоби́льный заво́д, БАЗ, romanized: Bryansky Avtomobilny Zavod) is a Russian manufacturer of military vehicles based in Bryansk, Russia.

It was established in 1958 as a subsidiary of ZiL. It is one of the leading Russian military equipment manufacturers. It also produces off-road tractors and chassis with carrying capacity from 14 to 40 tons.

Since 2015 it is part of the Almaz-Antey holding.

== History ==
Bryansk Automobile Plant was founded 4 June 1958 [1] as a branch of the Moscow factory ZIL for the manufacture of components: driving axles, barrels, boxes handout, suspension and other components for automobiles ZIL-131. The basis for the creation of new business was the manufacture tractor Bizhytskoho steel plant [1]. Already in 1959 from Moscow factory was moved production of vehicles for the army, and in 1960 on the base created a special closed design bureau and independent production. In 1961 the first development of the plant, BAZ-930, was tested, but the series did not go, and instead plant began production modifications Moscow ZIL-135L: ZIL-135LM, with manual transmission, processed BAZ-135MB and BAZ-135MBK. These machines differ typical four-axis location - average close together, front and rear spaced and managed.

In the mid-1960s in the BC plant was begun designing triaxial floating chassis with four-wheel drive. The paper used backlogs and design principles taken from ZIL, such as airborne transmission and extreme steam driven wheels. The result was the design of a family of triaxial chassis BAZ-5937, BAZ-5938 and BAZ-5939 rear engine, which became the basis of machines SAM Osa and BAZ-5921 as well as BAZ-5922 mid-engined, which was based missile system "Point".

From March 1971 by order of the Ministry of Defence KB plant began designing a new series of standardized four-chassis, which received the name "Base". As part of this development was created several models floating ground and chassis widespread. This series of pairwise grouping sets of axles, front pair - controllable.

== Vehicles ==
=== Military ===
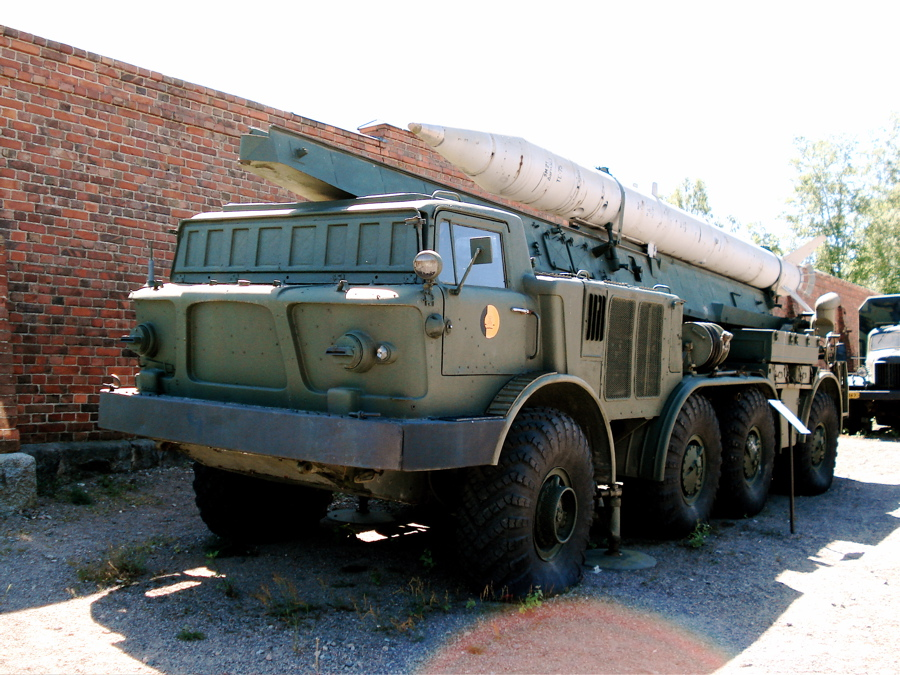
East German ZIL-135 equipped with a 9K52 Luna-M missile

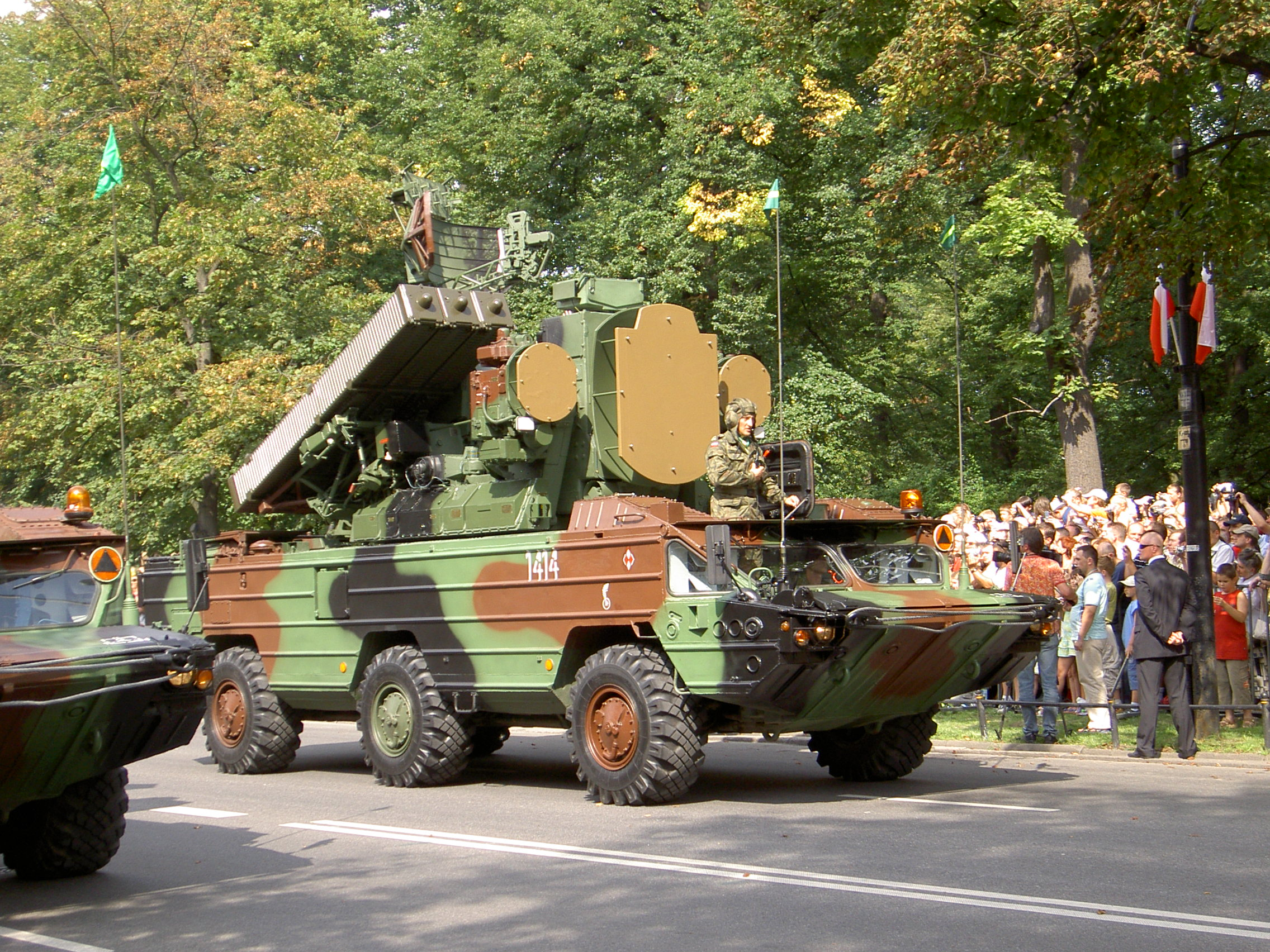
Polish BAZ-5937 9K33 Osa

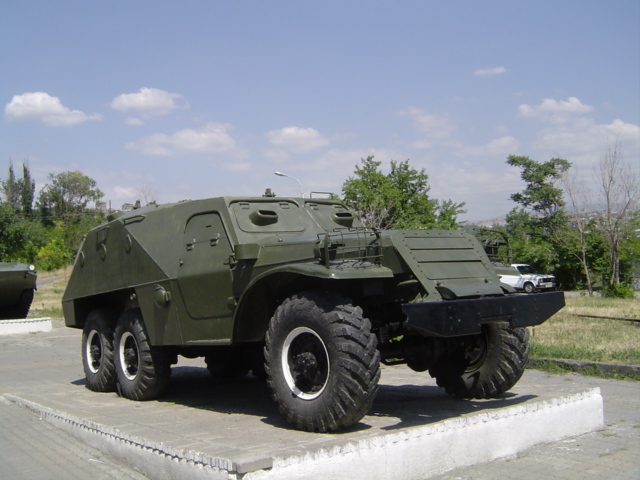
BTR-152 in Yerevan, Armenia

BAZ is known mainly for its military vehicles.

BAZ developed and manufactured platforms various Soviet and Russian SAM systems such as 9K33 Osa and S-400.

- BTR-152V1 (1958-1962) [2]
- ZIL-485A (1958-1962)
- BAZ-930
- ZIL-135LM (1964-1994)
- BAZ-135MB (1965-1996)
- six-wheel amphibious BAZ-5937 (1969-1990) and BAZ-5921 (1971-1990)
- "Base" / "Wax"
  - amphibious four- BAZ-6944 (1979-1989) and their modifications non-amphibious BAZ-6948 (1986-1989)
  - BAZ-6950, BAZ-69501, BAZ-69502 and BAZ-69506 (1976-1999)
- BAZ-6953
- BAZ-9А331М

=== Civil ===
Crane Chassis

- two axles BAZ-8027 - during a 32-ton crane
- three axles BAZ-8029 - for 25-ton crane truck crane plant Ivanovo
- four axles
  - BAZ-6909.8 - under the 50-ton crane for handling dangerous goods
  - five axle KSh-8973 - for 100-ton crane KS-8973

Tractor

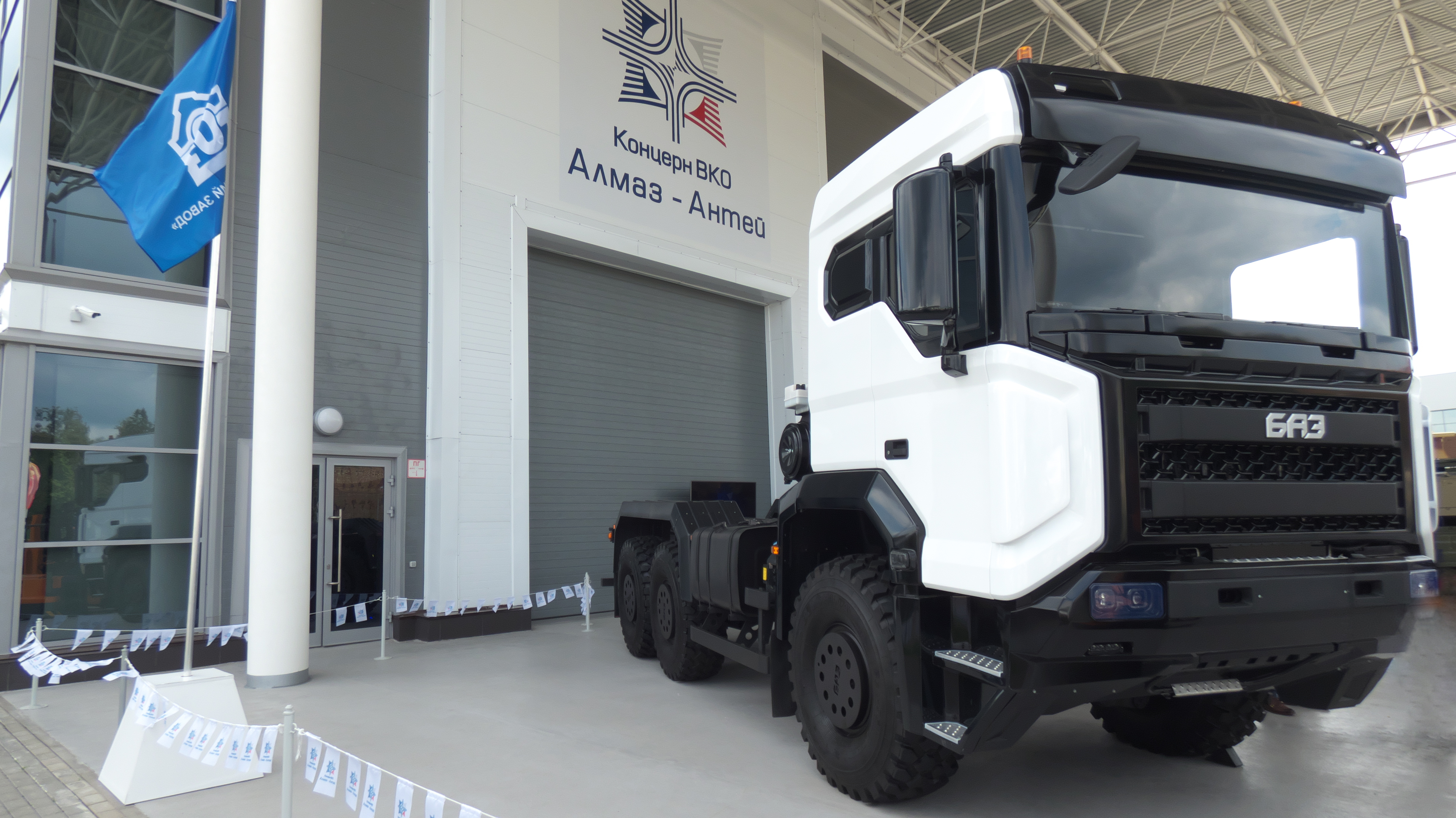
BAZ-S36A11 on "Army-2023"

- Road tractor BAZ-6403
- Pipe in the tractor BAZ-64031 with a trailer BAZ-9049
- Road tractor-terrain BAZ-64022

Special chassis

- Three axle BAZ-69095 - up to 14.7 tonnes
- Four axle BAZ-690902 - up to 22 tons
- Five axle BAZ-69096 - up to 33 tons
- Six axle BAZ-69099 - up to 40 tons

BAZ Civilian vehicles are used in the oil and construction industries in the mobile drilling installations and repairs as tanks, valves, pumps and cementing installation.

== Gallery ==
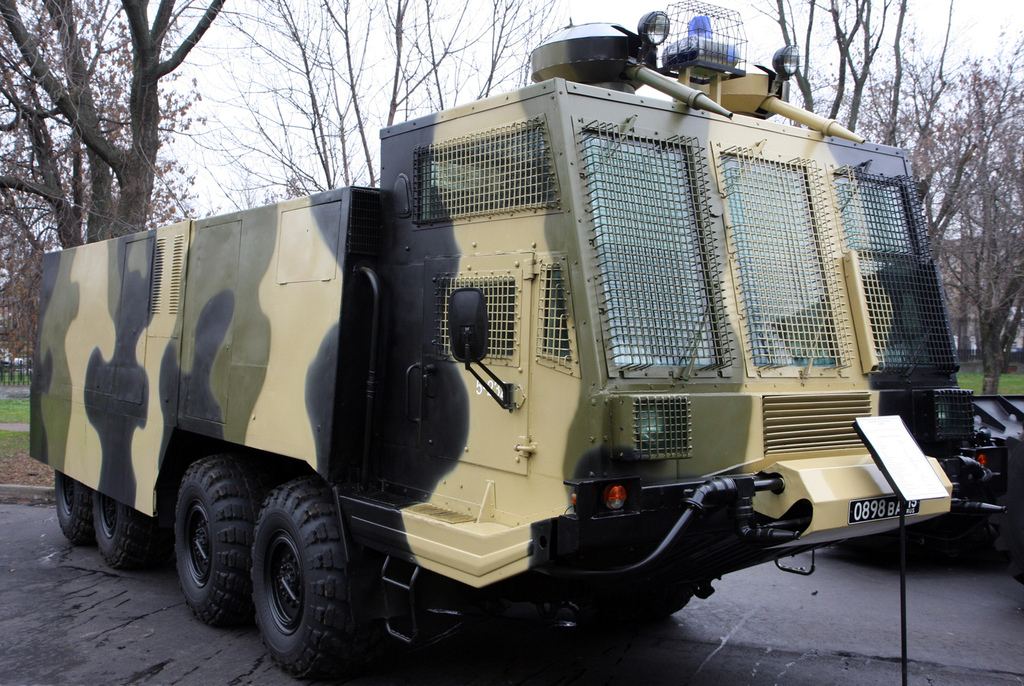
MVD Internal Troops ABS-40 "Lavina" riot control water cannon on BAZ-6953 chassis

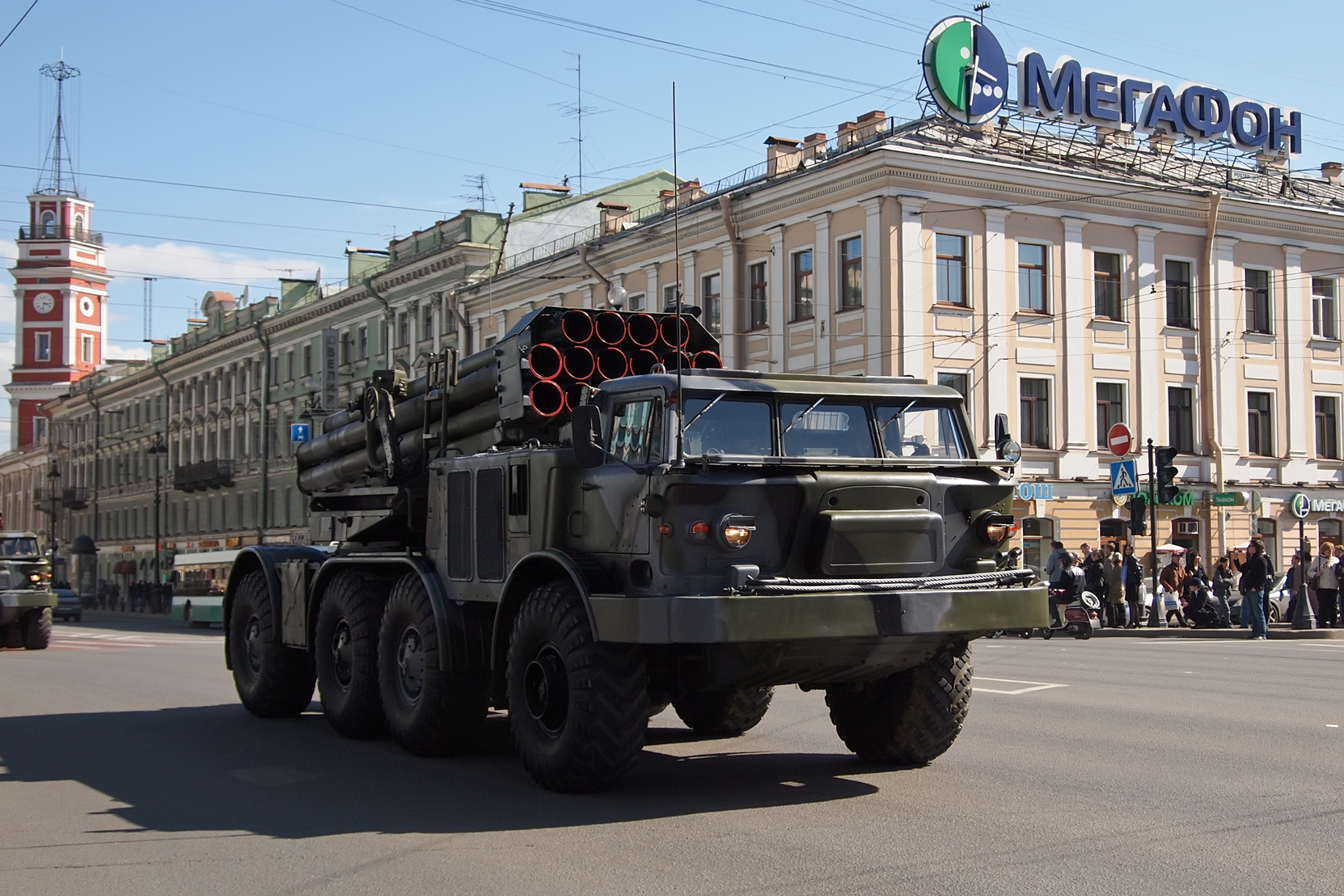
BM-27 Uragan rocket system at ZIL-135LPM

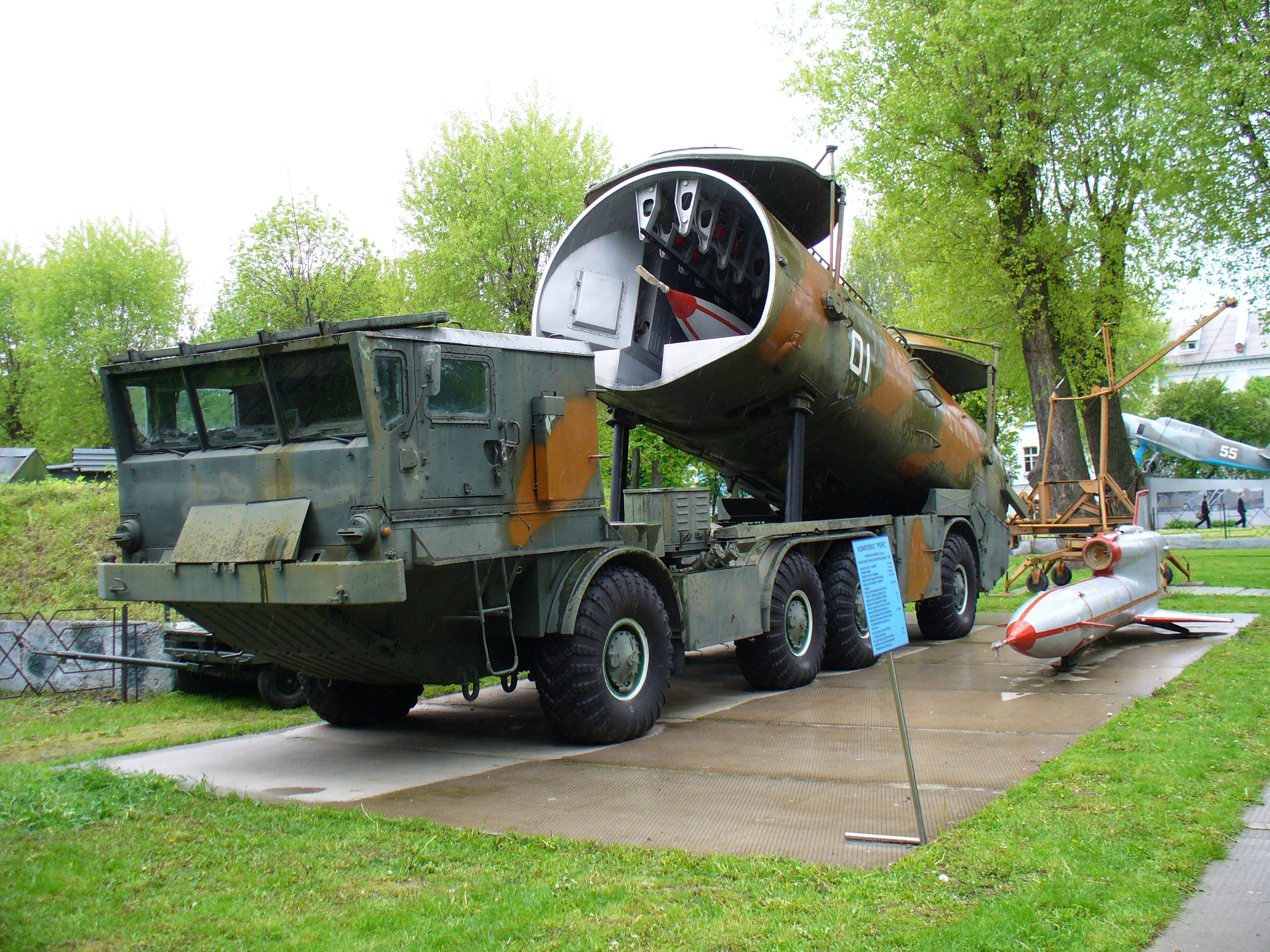
BAZ-135MB with Tupolev Tu-143 UAV

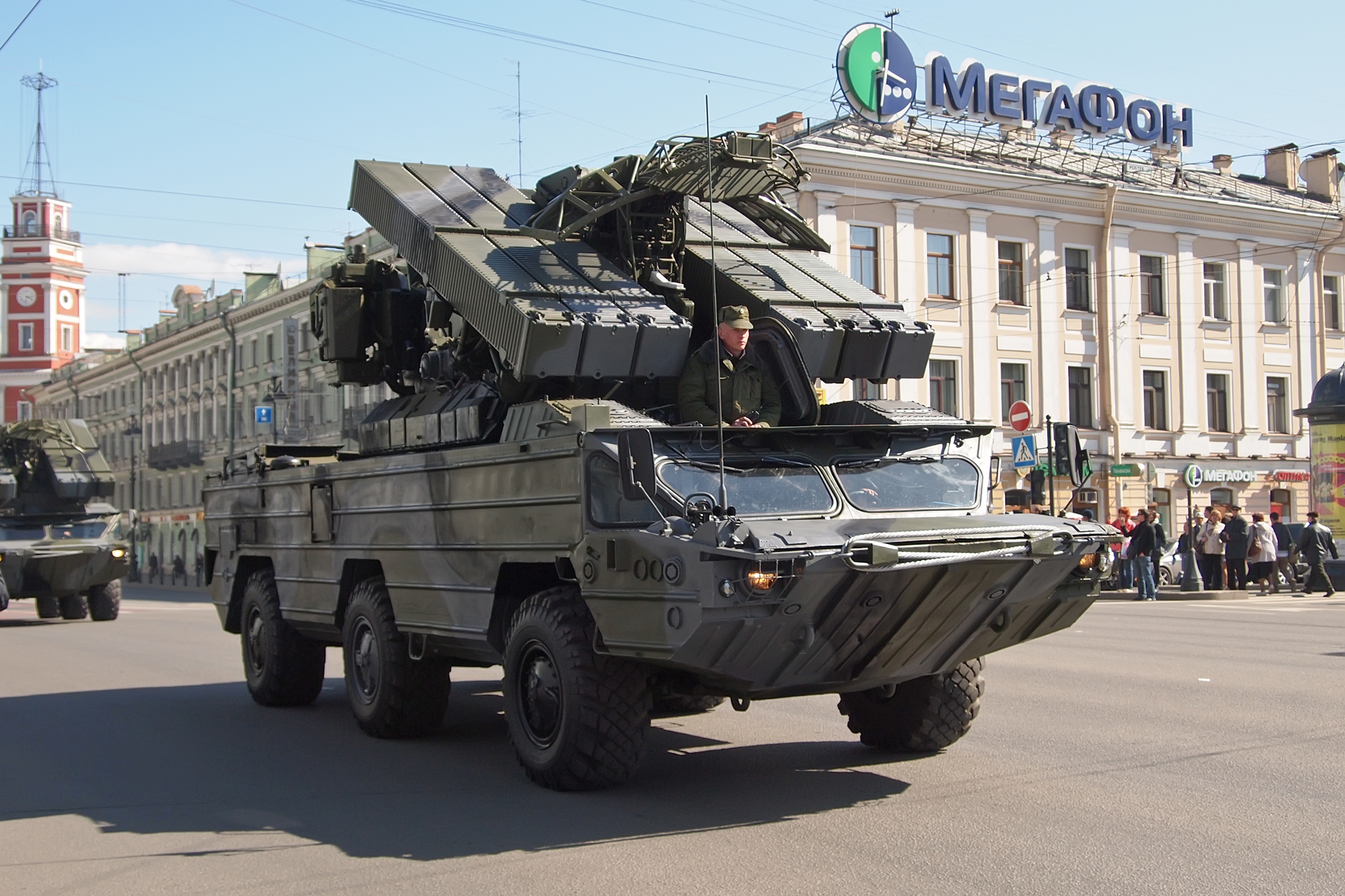
9K33 Osa-AKM at BAZ-5937 chassis

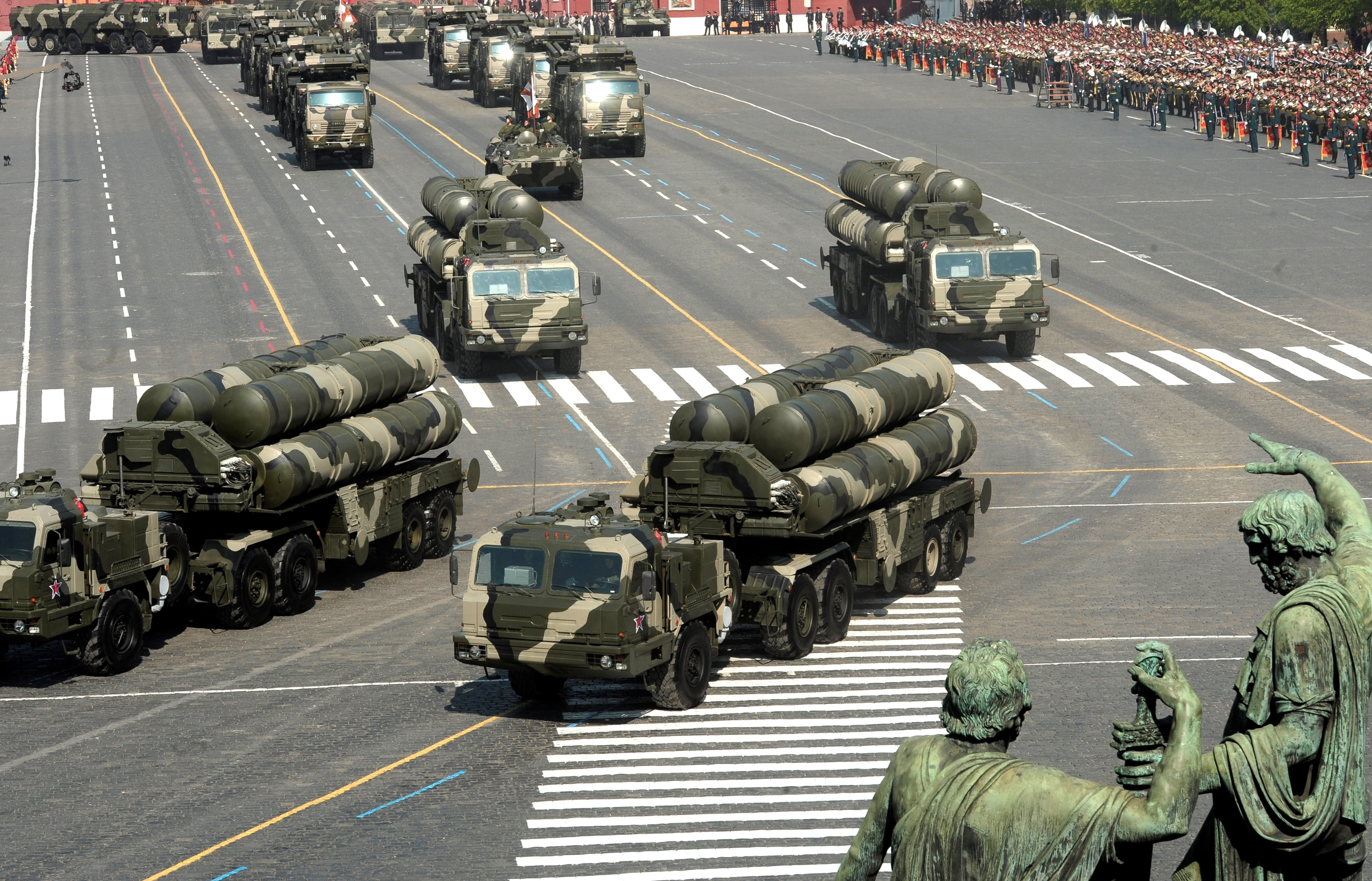
S-400 at BAZ-64022

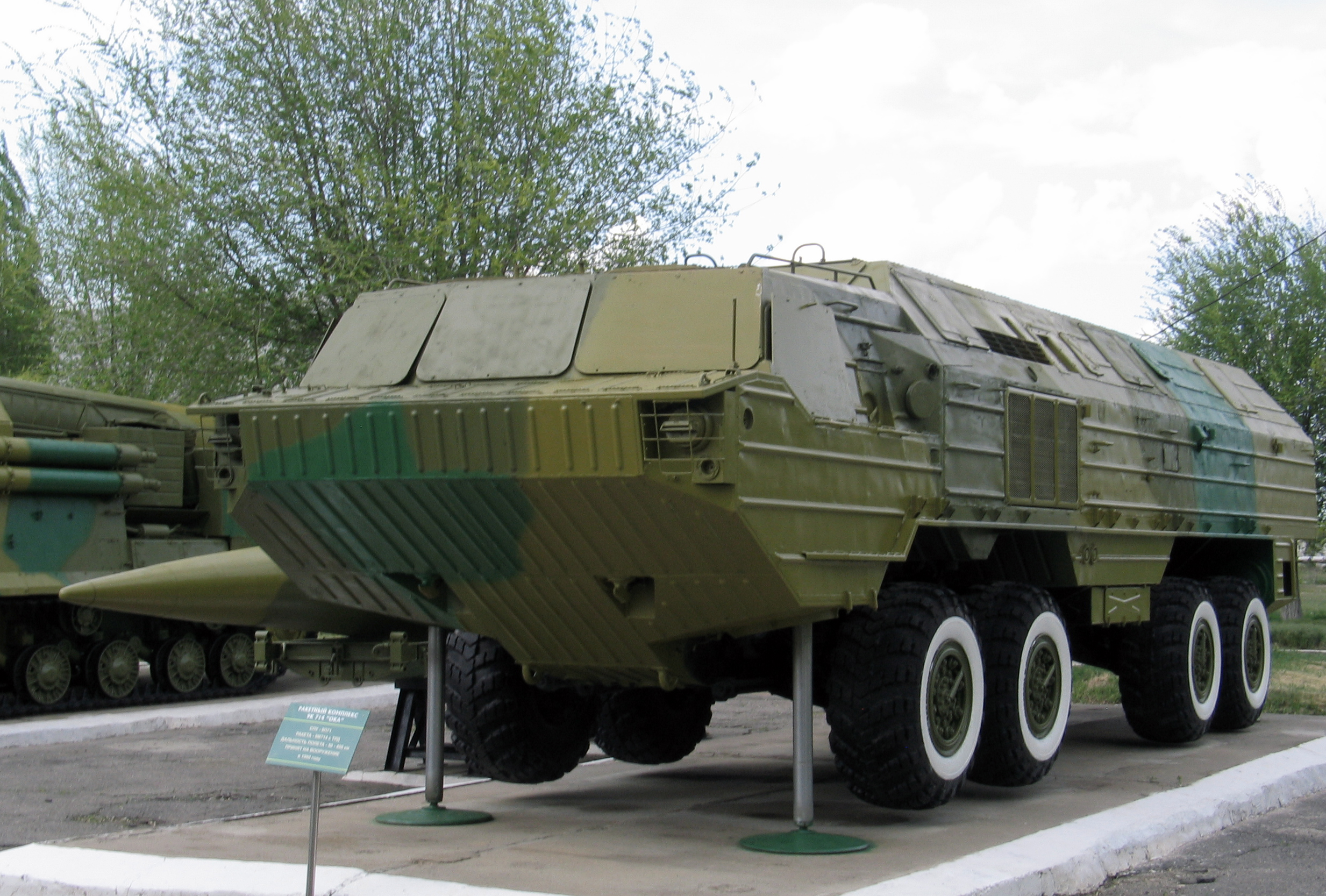
9P71 Transporter-Erector-Launcher on BАZ-6944 of 9K714 missile complex «Oka»
