= MAZ-535 =

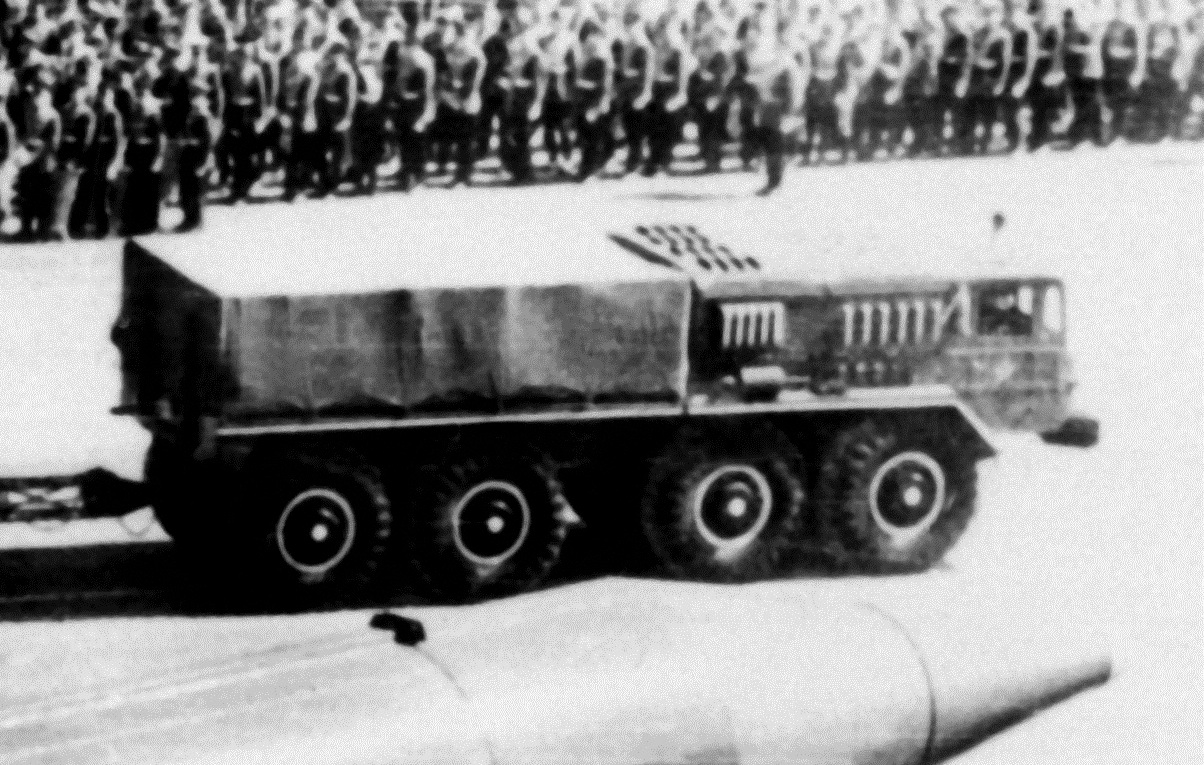
- MAZ-535 military heavy tractor
- Type: Heavy artillery/missile transport vehicle
- Place of origin: USSR

Service history
- In service: 1958–1964
- Used by: USSR Soviet Armed Forces

Production history
- Designer: B. L. Shaposhnik
- Designed: 1954–1959
- Manufacturer: MAZ / KZKT
- Produced: 1958–1964
- Variants: MAZ-535B, MAZ-535V

Specifications
- Mass: 19 t
- Length: 8780 mm
- Width: 2805 mm
- Height: 2915 mm
- Crew: 4
- Armor: None
- Engine: D-12-A-375
- Payload capacity: 7 t
- Drive: 8×8
- Transmission: Hydromechanical
- Suspension: Independent on all wheels
- Ground clearance: 475 mm
- Fuel capacity: 700 L
- Maximum speed: 60 km/h

MAZ-535 is a family of heavy four-axle (8x8) tractor trucks developed between 1954 and 1959 by the Special Design Bureau of the Minsk Automobile Plant under the direction of B. L. Shaposhnik. From 1958 to 1961, they were produced at the Minsk plant, and from 1961, production was transferred to the Kurgan Wheel Tractor Plant, where they were manufactured until 1964, when they were replaced by the more powerful MAZ-537 family of tractors.

The design of the MAZ-535 featured several distinctive technical solutions, including: a trough-shaped frame with Z-shaped side members, independent suspension of all single-wheel drive wheels, bogey-type axle arrangement, steerable wheels of the front bogey, central tire inflation system, hydromechanical transmission, inter-axle and inter-wheel self-locking differentials, all-metal four-seat cabin, power steering, pneumatic-hydraulic brake system, as well as a third headlight with infrared illumination in the center of the cabin for use with night vision devices.

MAZ-535 tractors were widely used in the Strategic Rocket Forces of the Reserve of the Supreme High Command for transporting ballistic missiles. It was in this role that the vehicle was often seen during numerous military parades on Red Square. On the MAZ-535B chassis, prototype launchers for the tactical missiles "Onega" and "Ladoga" were developed. The MAZ-535V towed launchers for the short-range missile complex "Temp" and unmanned aircraft Tu-121 and Tu-123 (DBR "Yastreb-1").

== History ==
By decree of the Council of Ministers of the USSR (CMS) No. 1258-563ss dated June 25, 1954, "On the creation of production capacities and provision of artillery capacities to the Ministry of Defense of the USSR", Special Design Bureaus (SKB) were established at major automobile plants in the USSR for the development of military equipment. On the Minsk Automobile Plant, on July 23 of the same year, a secret unit p/o R-6131 SKB No. 1 (SKB-1) was established by director's order No. 15ss, headed by Boris Lvovich Shaposhnik, and on September 1, a closed experimental production shop (TsOP) was also created.

One of the first tasks of SKB-1 was the creation of four-axle all-wheel-drive MAZ-535 and MAZ-536 tractor units for towing artillery systems and other weapons with a weight of 10 and 15 tons respectively. The Ministry of Defense set very high requirements for mobility (half-meter ground clearance, ability to ford up to 1.3 m, climb slopes of up to 30 degrees), fuel range, and operating conditions (from −50 °C to +50 °C).

Development of the MAZ-535 began in September 1954. In May–June 1956, two initial prototypes were assembled. Tests revealed insufficient frame strength, which could not ensure kinematic consistency of various transmission elements under dynamic loads. Designers of Special Design Bureau developed a new riveted and welded ladder-type frame made of steel sheet rolled stock with a trough-shaped cross-section and inclined Z-shaped longitudinals; this frame design was later used in all subsequent multi-axle vehicles of the Minsk plant.

In summer 1957, three MAZ-535A vehicles underwent trials in various climate zones. The modified version received a strengthened frame, bodywork, engine compartment ventilation system, and was also equipped with a winch. Externally, MAZ-535A differed by having two windshields instead of three and a raised engine compartment (so that it and the cab had the same roof height), which was equipped with a double row of vertical slits instead of folding side hatches for air intake. Later versions removed the center headlight in the cab and added small round fairings with position lights on the cab sides.

Based on test results, MAZ-535A was recommended for serial production in 1957. The design team led by B. L. Shaposhnik included D. E. Katsnelson, V. V. Drobyzhevsky, A. M. Pechenev, B. M. Rabinovich, A. I. Khrenov, A. Kh. Lefarov, G. I. Kenik, K. G. Kukushkin, B. N. Shkirich, I. L. Sheinker, among others. Some sources believe the design layout of MAZ-535 was inspired by the captured German armored vehicle Büssing-NAG ARK, with lockable inter-axle differentials and independent suspension for all wheels.

Limited production of MAZ-535A took place from 1958 to 1961 at the TsOP experimental production, which was reorganized in 1959 into assembly shop No. 3 (MSC-3), and in 1960, into a dedicated automotive assembly and testing shop (CSIA-2). From 1959, the next version, the semi-trailer tractor MAZ-535V, was also produced. Later, production was transferred from Minsk to the Kurgan Wheel Tractor Plant (KZKT). The first Kurgan-made MAZ-535A was assembled in June 1960; production of MAZ-535V followed.

The vehicle was shown publicly on November 7, 1961, at a Red Square Parade towing a special trailer with a R-14 Chusovaya. On July 16, 1962, the MAZ-535A was adopted by the Soviet Army. Unlike the MAZ-537, which was exported to many countries, the MAZ-535 served only in the Soviet Army.

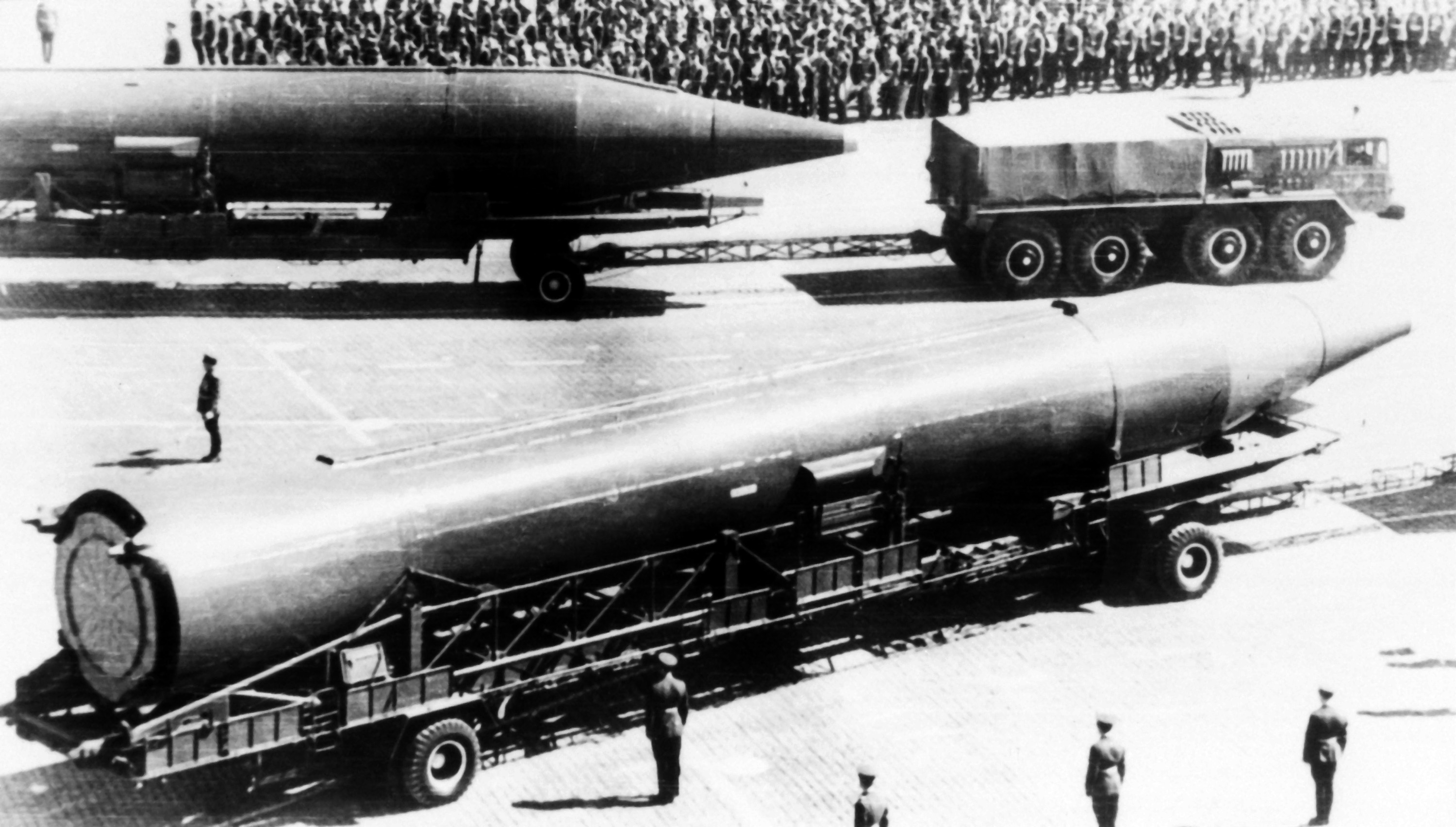
R-14 missile towed by MAZ-535A, 1977

The MAZ-535A tractors were used from the late 1950s to tow 152 mm M-47 guns and special transport trailers with ballistic missiles such as R-5, R-12 (8K63), R-14 (8K65), R-16 (8K64), R-26, R-36 (8K67), GR-1 (8K713), and RT-15. In 1958, to transport the R-12 missile (launch weight 42 t), a trailer 8T115 was created with single wheels on the front axle and twin wheels on the rear axle (dimensions 22,850×2720×2500 mm). Later, for the R-16 missile (launch weight 150 t), a two-axle trailer 8T139 was developed. During the parade in Moscow on May 9, 1965, a MAZ-535A towed experimental GR-1 missiles (launch weight 117 t) on this trailer.

In addition to strictly military applications, MAZ-535A tractors were also used in the civilian economy to transport large indivisible cargo. For example, when transporting a 200-ton transformer for the Inguri Hydroelectric Station, a convoy of three MAZ-535A tractors was used.

To mount missile launchers on the MAZ-535A base, an experimental chassis MAZ-535B was created. In 1959, the D-110K experimental launcher for the tactical system "Onega" with the 3M1 missile (launch weight up to 3 t) was mounted at the Ural Machine-Building Plant. Tests took place in 1960. On February 5, 1960, development of the system was terminated by Council of Ministers Decree No. 138-48. In April 1961, tests began for the "Ladoga" tactical complex with the 3M2 missile (launch weight 3150 kg). Three launches between July–September 1961 ended with missile destruction due to design flaws. A batch of improved missiles was prepared in early 1962, but on March 3, 1962, the system was cancelled by No. 213-113. The MAZ-535B chassis was deemed too weak for use as a launch platform. Instead, in 1961 the "Luna" complex was adopted with various missile types. Ironically, the chassis of the 2P16 launcher, based on the amphibious tank PT-76, had limited durability and required a special semi-trailer to be towed by the MAZ-535V tractor.

Among all variants of the 535 family, the MAZ-535V semi-trailer tractor was the most widely used. For transporting heavy tracked equipment and missile systems, trailers such as MAZ-5248 and MAZ-9989 were often paired with the MAZ-535V. The latter was used to transport the tracked pipe-laying machine TUM-150.

According to Council of Ministers Decree No. 839-379 dated July 21, 1959, NII-1 (later the Moscow Institute of Thermal Technology) began designing the first Soviet solid-fuel guided tactical missile 9M71 "Temp" with a range of 600 km and a 300 kt warhead. The 9P11 launcher (Br-225) was to be mounted on a MAZ-535V paired with the MAZ-5248 semi-trailer (25 t capacity)(other sources mention the MAZ-537B). The Br-225 launcher development began on February 14, 1959, at the "Barrikady" plant. The Br-234 test stand for flight tests was built in 1960, and a prototype Br-225 was ready by 1962. Br-240 (for helicopter transport) and Br-264 (on MAZ-543 chassis) launchers were also in development. Tests showed insufficient performance of the missile, and the project was cancelled.

A separate chapter of the MAZ-535's history is its use as a launch vehicle for heavy UAVs. From September 23, 1957, Tupolev began work on the strategic supersonic strike UAV "aircraft 121" (Tu-121, "S" product) with a range up to 4000 km and a nuclear warhead. Initially, the 4-axle ST-10 launch trailer was towed by a YAZ-214 (or YAZ-210D), later replaced by MAZ-535V (some sources cite MAZ-535A or just MAZ-535). Launcher transport mass: 27,650 kg (without aircraft: 21,250 kg), aircraft launch mass: 32,600 kg (other: 35,000 kg), including 16,000 kg fuel, fuselage diameter: 1.7 m, wingspan: 8.4 m, length: 24.77 m, launcher length: 25 m, width: 6.0 m (launch) / 3.2 m (transport), rail length: 10 m, max transport speed: 40 km/h (road), 20 km/h (off-road). Wing consoles, rudders, and boosters were detached during transport; warhead and control equipment transported separately. An electric generator (several dozen kW) was installed on the tractor to start the KR-15-300 turbojet.

On August 25, 1959, the first Tu-121 launch was successfully performed. Four more were completed by year’s end. A rabbit was used to demonstrate in-vehicle remote launch. Despite successful factory tests, Tu-121 was cancelled on November 11, 1959 by the Military-Industrial Commission due to advances in ballistic missile technology. The termination was formalized by February 5, 1960. In parallel, OKB-156 developed Tu-123, a long-range thermonuclear UAV, later redesignated as the reconnaissance drone "Yastreb-1".

On August 16, 1960, the government authorized development of the long-range UAV reconnaissance system DBR-1 "Yastreb" with the Tu-123 ("Sh" product). Based on Tu-121, the Tu-123 was redesigned for reconnaissance. The warhead was replaced with photographic and electronic intel equipment, transported separately. This enabled the use of a 2-axle SURED-1 (ST-30) trailer instead of a 4-axle one. Launch setup included the SARDE-1 tractor (STA-30) and the CARD-1C (KSM-123) control vehicle. During tests, a MAZ-535V with armored cab was used; later, a MAZ-537D with generator and control equipment was used. Factory tests ended in September 1961, state trials in December 1963. On May 23, 1964, the DBR-1 "Yastreb" was accepted into VVS service. The system was retired in 1979.

From 1956, the MAZ-536 and MAZ-537 were developed. The main difference was the D-12-A engine rated at 525 hp (some sources: 520 hp). A single MAZ-536 prototype was built in 1957 and passed acceptance tests in 1958. Due to increased missile and armor weight, focus shifted to MAZ-537 in July 1959; its first models appeared in late 1958. With documentation transfer to the KZKT and mass production starting in late 1964, MAZ-535 production was discontinued.

Production volumes: 1961 — ~200 units; 1962 — ~150. A few MAZ-535A units were stored until the early 1990s at a military base in Gar-Pokrovskoye (Odintsovo District, Moscow Oblast), 10 km from Golitsyno Golitsyno station. Their fate is unknown.

== Specifications ==
- Wheel formula - 8×8
- Carrying capacity - 7,000 kg (15,432 lb)
- Maximum weight - 18,975 kg (41,833 lb)
- Trailer weight - 15,000 kg (33,069 lb)
- Velocity - 60 km/h (37 mph)
- Dimensions - 8,780 mm (345.7 in)×2,805 mm (110.4 in)×2,915 mm (114.8 in)
- Track width - 2,150 mm (84.6 in)
- Wheelbase - 5,750 mm (226.4 in)
- Engine - Liquid-cooled diesel
- Power - 375 hp (280 kW) (at 1650 rpm)

== Literature ==
- Kochnev, Yevgeny D. (2011). “Experimental Vehicles of SKB-1 of Minsk Auto Plant.” In: Secret Vehicles of the Soviet Army. Moscow: Eksmo, Yauza. ISBN 978-5-699-50821-1.
- Sergeev, P. N. (ed.). (2004). Heavy Tank Tractor MAZ-535/537. Kirov: Kirov Society of Military Technology and Modeling Enthusiasts. Vol. 101. Series: Military Machines.
- Sergeyev, V. (1968). “Five-Year Plan Technology. Giant Off-Roader.” Za Rulem magazine, No. 7, pp. 8–9.
- Koletatov, Andrey. (2002). “Multi-Axle Veteran ‘MAZ-535’.” Automotive Modeling, No. 1, pp. 2–8.
