= KZKT-7428 =

Russian tank transporter

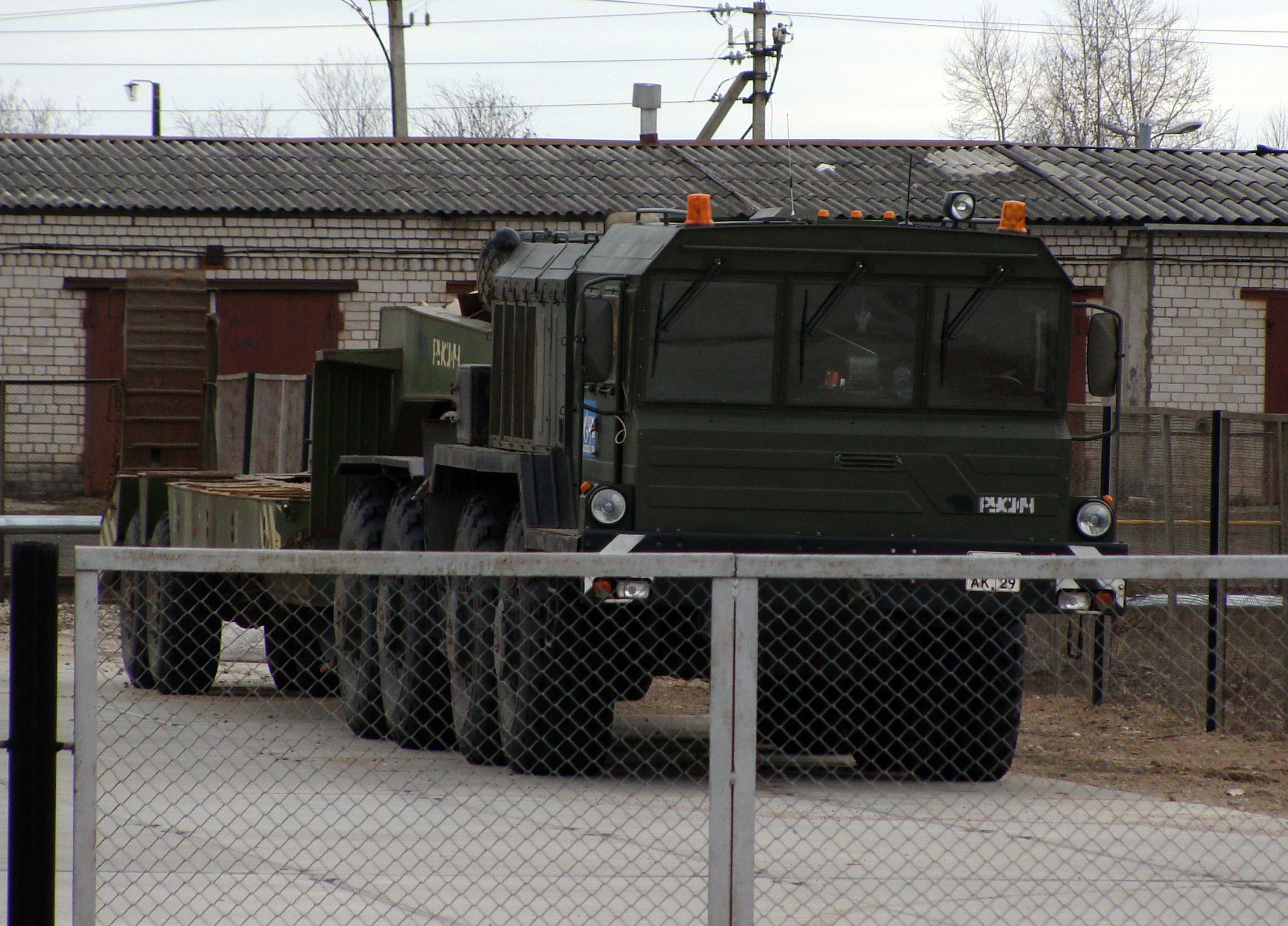
- KZKT-7428 Rusich

Overview
- Manufacturer: KZKT
- Production: 1990-2010

Powertrain
- Engine: YaMZ; YaMZ-8401.10-14 V12 diesel engine
- Range: 1500 km

Dimensions
- Length: 10,060 mm (396.1 in)
- Width: 2,880 mm (113.4 in)
- Height: 3,060 mm (120.5 in)
- Curb weight: 23,000 kg (50,706 lb)

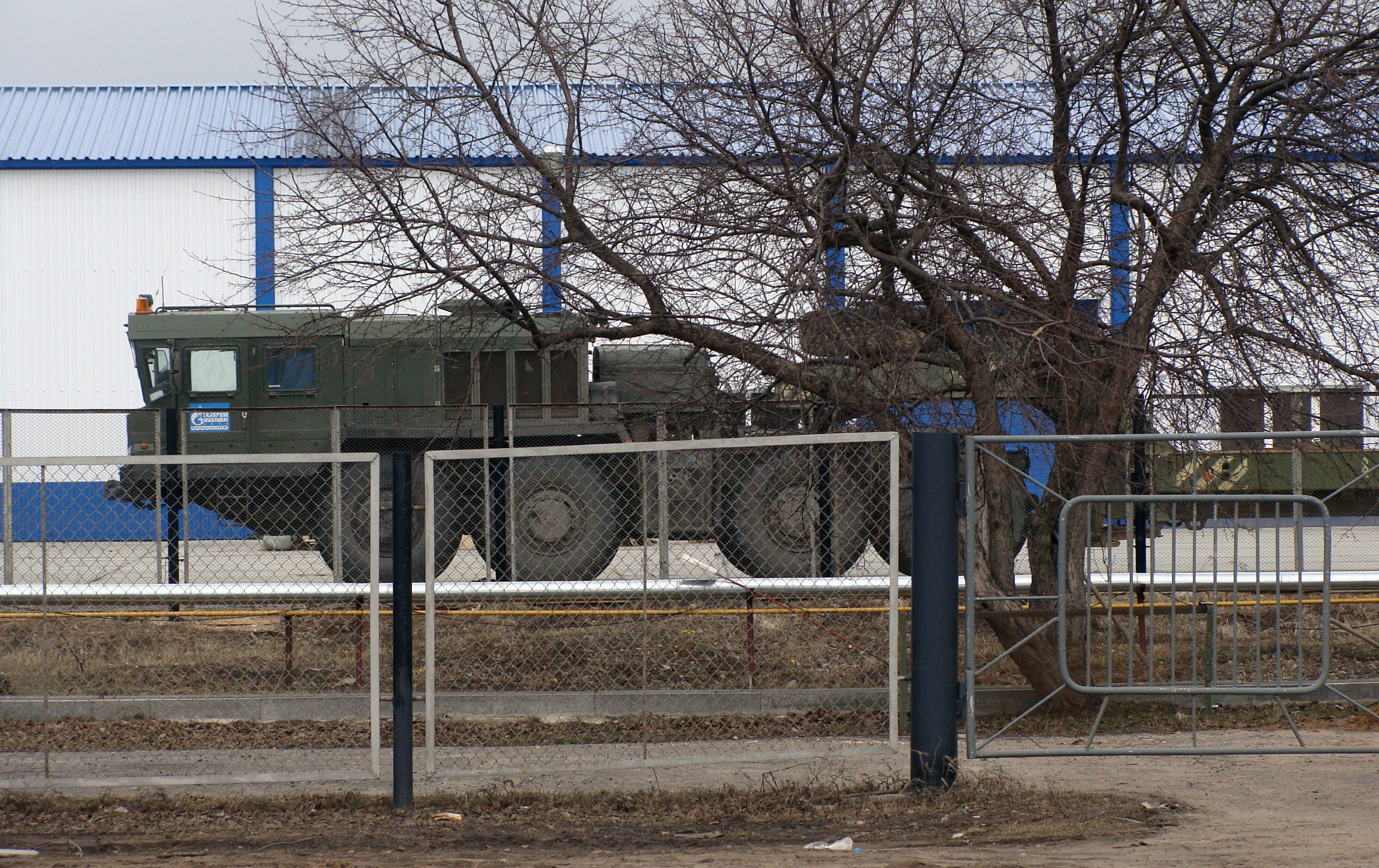
KZKT-7428

The KZKT-7428 Rusich tank transporter artillery tractor was developed as a successor to the MAZ-537 by KZKT. It can haul semi-trailers loads up to 70 t, both on and off-road. It entered service with the Soviet Army in 1990.

== Development history ==
As early as the 1970s, there were efforts to replace the first widely used and by then outdated Soviet tank transporter MAZ-537 with a new design. The main task for the developers at the Kurgan Wheel Tractor Plant (KZKT) was to increase the engine power. In the mid-1970s, prototypes such as the KZKT-545 (with a W38 diesel engine and double cab) and the KZKT-7426 (with a D12A-650 diesel engine) were produced, but neither went into series production. The main reason was the shortage of powerful tank engines required for these models.

In 1978, political directives were issued to KZKT to develop tractors capable of towing loads of 150, 300, and 600 tons. The result was the KZKT-7427, equipped with a D-12AN-650 diesel engine (38.88 liters displacement). Again, the availability of such engines was poor, and their service life was too short — they would wear out after just one year of normal use. Therefore, it was decided to replace the tank engine with a different V12 diesel engine, the YaMZ-8401, from the Yaroslavl Motor Plant. Although it also produced 650 hp (478 kW), it had a smaller displacement of just under 26 liters. Testing of the vehicle began in 1985.

Based on the experience with the KZKT-7426 and 7427 models, the KZKT-7428 was developed in the late 1980s. KZKT used the same YaMZ-8401 diesel engine model also used in dump trucks from the Belarusian manufacturer BelAZ. The trucks passed all tests and were recommended for series production, which began in 1990.

Compared to the MAZ-537, the cab, transmission, and engine were modernized. The engine was positioned directly behind the newly designed cab, which accommodated the driver and five additional crew members. The vehicle typically featured all-wheel drive with single tires on each axle. KZKT produced not only a four-axle (8×8) version, but also variants with three (6×6) and five axles (10×8). Production ended by 2011 when the manufacturer was dissolved due to insolvency.

== Variants ==
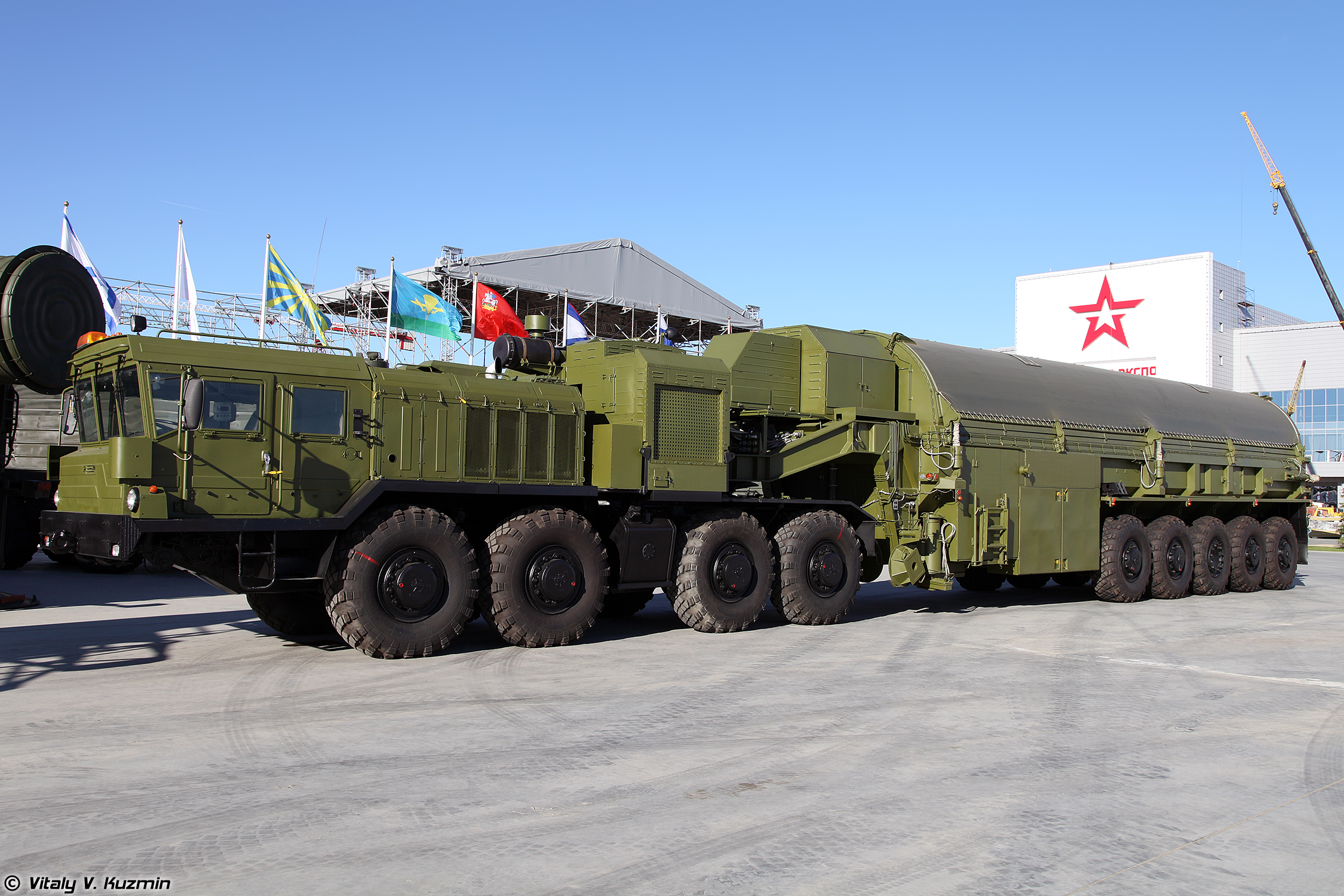
KZKT-74281 with semi-trailer for missile transport (2016)

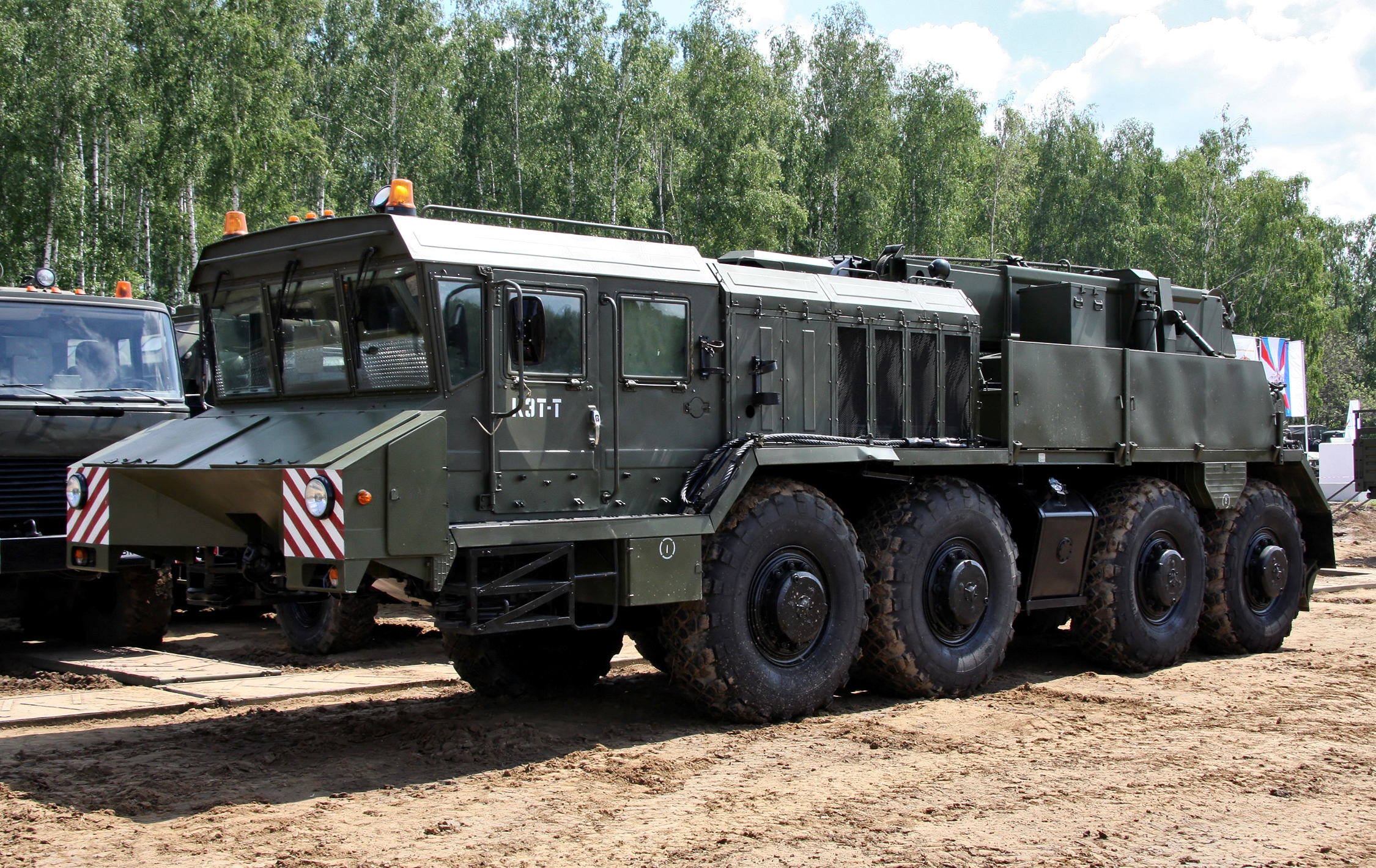
KET-T on KZKT-7428-012 chassis

The following list is not exhaustive:

- KZKT-7428 – Base model, series production began in 1990
- KZKT-7428-011 – Equipped with Cummins KTA19-C650 diesel engine (650 hp)
- KZKT-7428-012 – Uses the D-12A-525 engine with 525 hp
- KZKT-7428-014 – Designed with two KZKT-9003 trailers for transporting pipeline pipes
- KZKT-74281 – Tractor with 15-ton winch, in production since 1990
- KZKT-74282 – Variant with ballast bed to improve traction, used as a heavy-duty transporter or aircraft tug. With a special transmission, it can tow aircraft up to 200 tons on runways or carry up to 75 tons off-road. It also has a winch.
- KZKT-74283 – Tractor with modified coupling, developed in 1991, likely no mass production
- KZKT-74284 – Prototype with powered trailers up to 70 tons; features extra modules behind the cab
- KZKT-74286 – Civilian variant with YaMZ-240NM1B diesel engine, 500 hp. Transmission was adapted, max speed limited to 55 km/h. Cooling/lubrication systems modified; military fittings removed. Produced from 1993
- KZKT-74286-014 – Civilian pipe transporter variant
- KZKT-74287 – Civilian tractor for up to 90-ton trailers; produced from 1995; max speed 45 km/h
- MTP-A4 – Also known as "Item 6965", a military recovery vehicle based on the KZKT-7428
- KZKT-8003 – Chassis with 3 axles and all-wheel drive (6×6)
- KZKT-8005 – Chassis with 4 axles and all-wheel drive (8×8)
- KZKT-8014 – Chassis with 5 axles (10×8)
- KET-T and KET-TM – Heavy recovery vehicle based on KZKT-7428-012 chassis, developed to replace the KET-T based on the MAZ-537

== Technical specifications ==
The manufacturer offered several versions of the KZKT-7428 series. The table below summarizes the key specifications. Source:

	KZKT-7428-011	KZKT-7428-013	KZKT-74286	KZKT-74287	KZKT-74282
Drive layout	8×8				
Crew capacity	5+1				
Length	10,060 mm				10,347 mm
Width	2,880 mm				3,300 mm
Height	3,063 mm				3,300 mm
Engine type	YaMZ-8401.10-14	Cummins KTA19-C650	YaMZ-240NM1B	YaMZ-8401.10-14	
Displacement	25.86 l	N/A	22.30 l	25.86 l	
Power output	478 kW (650 hp)		368 kW (500 hp)	478 kW (650 hp)	
Curb weight	23.7 t	23.7 t	22.8 t	25.0 t	---
Max trailer weight	100 t	100 t	70 t	100 t	---
Gross vehicle weight	123.7 t	123.7 t	122.8 t	125 t	41.6 t
Fuel tank capacity	900 l			900 l + 840 l	900 l
Max speed	65 km/h		55 km/h	45 km/h	65 km/h (on road); 20 km/h (towing aircraft)

== See also ==
- ZIL-135
- MAZ-7310
