= ZIL-135 =

Soviet self-propelled rocket artillery chassis

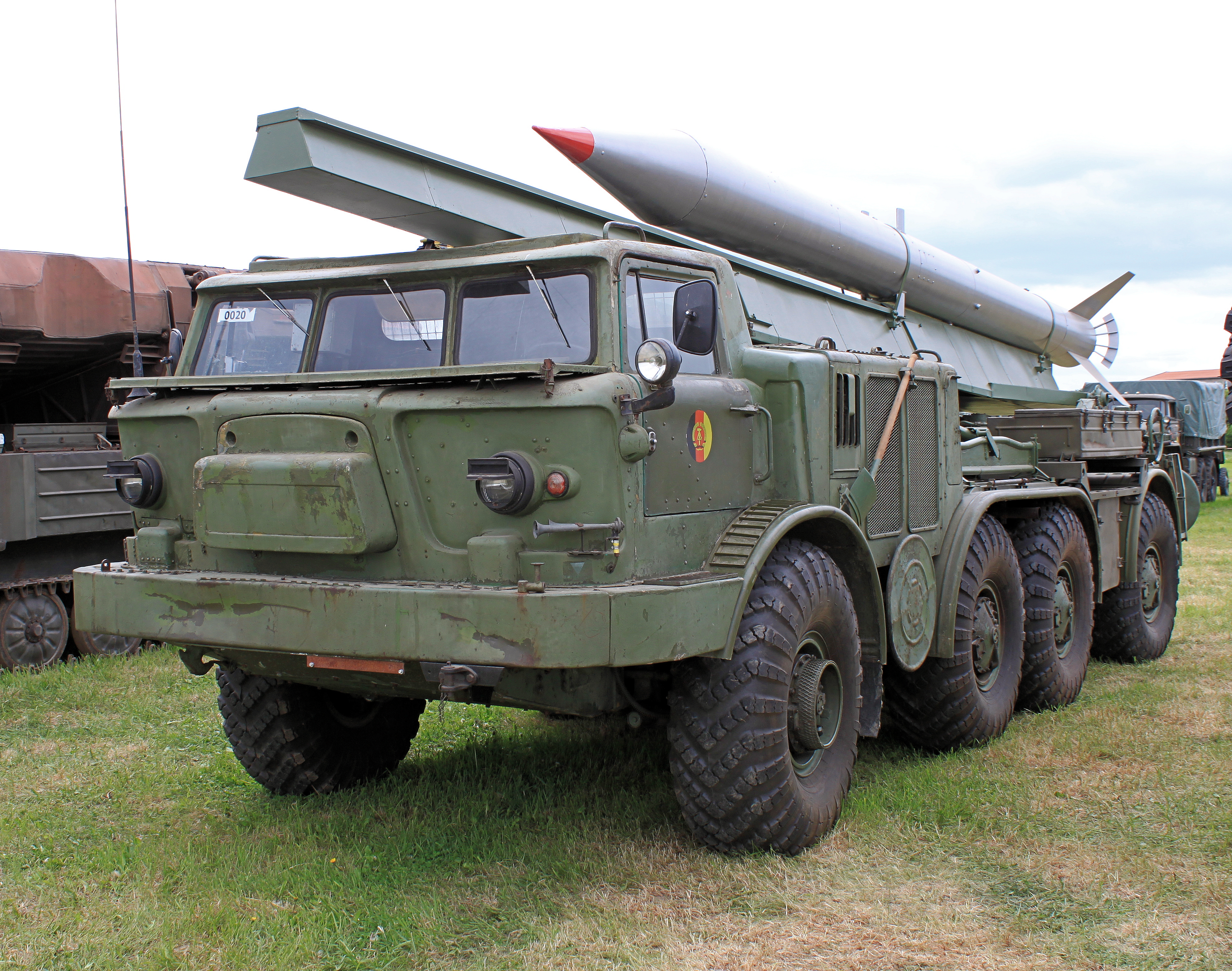
- An East German ZIL-135 equipped with a Luna-M rocket

Overview
- Manufacturer: ZiL; BAZ
- Production: 1959–1963 (ZIL); 1963–1994? (BAZ)

Body and chassis
- Layout: 8×8

Powertrain
- Engine: 5.6 L ZIL-123F I6 ×2 (prototype); 6.9 L ZIL-375YA V8 ×2
- Transmission: 6-speed automatic, x2; 5-speed manual, ×2 (ZIL-135LM)

Dimensions
- Length: 9,260 mm (364.6 in)
- Width: 3,130 mm (123.2 in)
- Height: 3,060 mm (120.5 in)
- Curb weight: 7,000 kg (15,432 lb)

The ZIL-135 is a large eight-wheeled military transport and self-propelled artillery truck manufactured by ZiL during the Cold War from the Soviet Union starting in 1959. Its purpose was to carry and launch a Luna-M (NATO: Frog-7) surface-to-surface artillery rocket. The ZIL-135 was widely exported to other communist countries, most notably North Korea, where it is a common sight in films and military marches. It also served as the TEL for the BM-27 Uragan artillery rocket system.

This vehicle has two gasoline engines that power its 20 tonnes to a maximum speed of 65 kilometres per hour (40 mph). One engine drives the four wheels on the left of the truck, while the other engine drives the four wheels on the right. The ZIL-135 has eight wheel drive, but only the front and rear axles are used for steering. It has a maximum cruising range of 500 kilometres (310 mi).

The cab of the ZIL-135 is NBC protected, allowing the rockets to be fired without exposing the crew to possible contaminants. The six-man crew can emplace or displace the system in three minutes.

== Variants ==
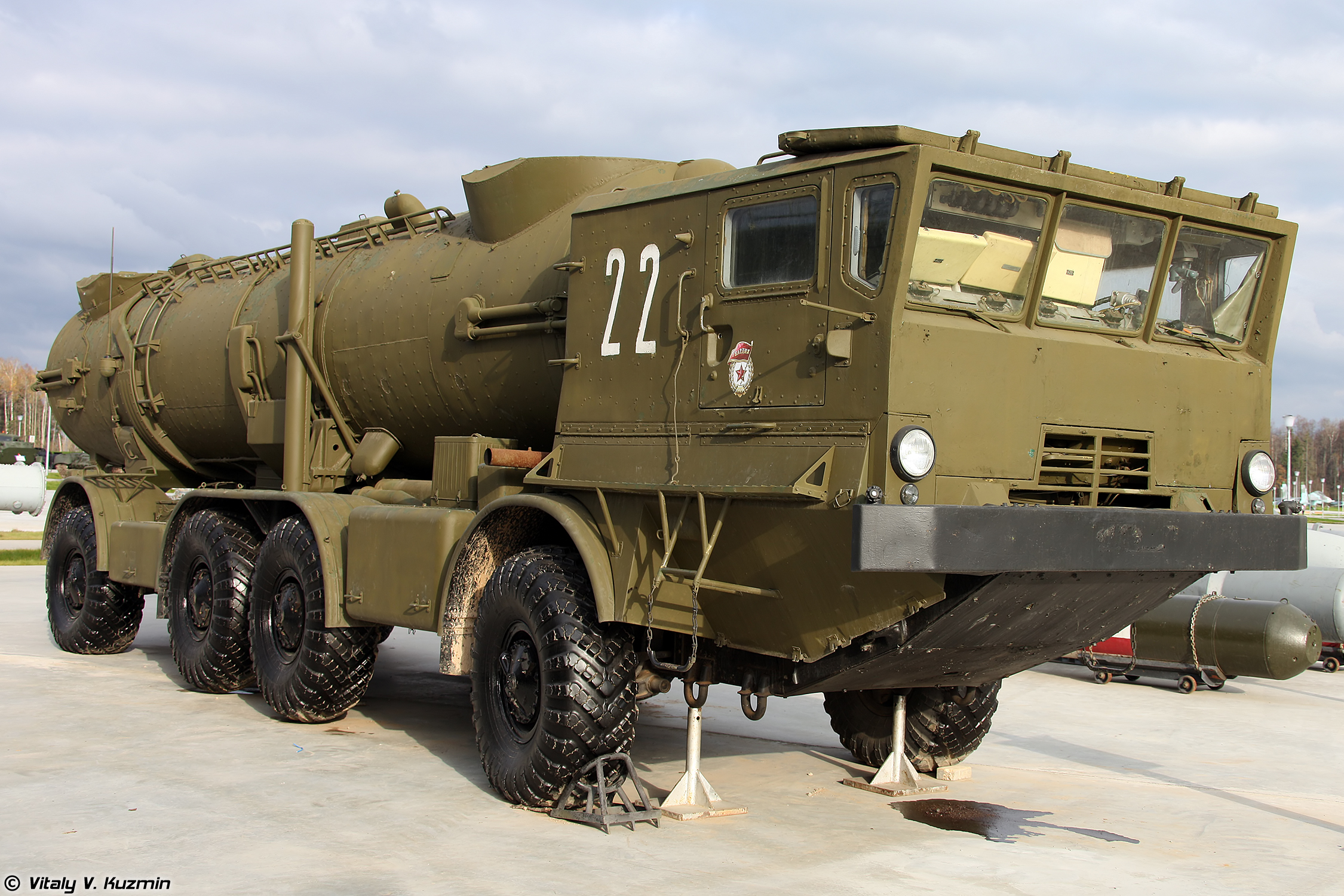
Transporter erector launcher on the basis of BAZ-135MB

=== ZiL ===
- ZIL-135 (9P113): launcher for 9K52 Luna-M (NATO: Frog-7) missile (1959)
  - ZIL-135B: amphibious version of ZIL-135 (1959)
  - ZIL-135E: non-amphibious version of ZIL-135B (1960)
  - ZIL-135L: improved suspension (1961)
  - ZIL-135LM: ZIL-135L with manual transmission (1963); production transferred to BAZ
- ZIL-135K: launcher for S-5 missile (1961), based on the ZIL-135E; production transferred to BAZ in 1962
  - ZIL-135E: diesel-electric transmission (1965)
  - ZIL-135KM: launcher for P-5 Pyatyorka (NATO: SS-N-3 Shaddock) missile (1962, prototype for BAZ)
  - ZIL-135KP: land train (1969)
  - ZIL-135LN: chassis-cab based on ZIL-135K
- ZIL-135P: amphibious landing transport (landing barge) (1965)
- ZIL-135SH: prototype zero-turn radius version. It had two ZIL-375Ya V8 engines, one to power a generator to drive the wheels on the front struts (from an Il-18) and the other drove the rear axle, which was from a ZIL-130.

=== BAZ ===
- ZIL-135K: launcher for FCR-2 missile (1961)
- BAZ-135LM: ZIL-135K with manual transmission (1963-1994)
  - BAZ-135LMT (BAZ-135L7): tropical weather version of BAZ-135LM (1968)
- BAZ-135LMP: launcher for BM-27 Uragan MLRS (1976)
- BAZ-135LTM: transporter for Luna-M missile (1963)
- BAZ-135L4: civilian version (1968)
- BAZ-E135G: experimental prototype with gas turbine engine
- BAZ-135M1: prototype with a single diesel engine
- BAZ-135MB: launcher for SPU-35V, Tu-143 and Tu-243 (1964)
  - BAZ-135MBP: BAZ-135MB with metal cargo platform
  - BAZ-135MBK: BAZ-135MB with increased cargo and towing capacity (1991)
  - BAZ-135MBL: (1993)

== Specifications ==
- Length: 30.41 ft (9.27 m)
- Width: 9.19 ft (2.80 m)
- Height: 8.30 ft (2.53 m)
- GVW (without missile): 11.57 tons
- Ground clearance: 580 mm (23 in)
- Pitch angle: 57°
- Engine: 2× ZIL-375YA V-8 6.9 liter gasoline engines
- Horsepower: 180 hp (130 kW) × 2
- Top speed: 40.39 mph (65.00 km/h)
- Range: 248.55 mi (400.00 km)
- Fuel consumption: 3 mpg_{‑US} (78.40 L/100 km) - 1 mpg_{‑US} (235.21 L/100 km)
