= Valentin Bliznyuk =

Russian and Soviet aerospace engineer

- Born: Valentin Ivanovich Bliznyuk; 12 April 1928; Malorossiyskoe, Kazakh Autonomous Socialist Soviet Republic, Soviet Union
- Died: 30 December 2019 (aged 91)
- Engineering career
- Discipline: Aeronautical Engineering
- Employer: Tupolev design bureau
- Significant design: Tu-160
- Awards: Order "For Merit to the Fatherland", 4th class Order of the Red Banner of Labour; Order of the Badge of Honour; USSR State Prize; Honoured Aircraft Builder

Valentin Ivanovich Bliznyuk (Russian: Валентин Иванович Близнюк; 12 April 1928 – 30 December 2019) was a Soviet and Russian aircraft designer who worked chiefly with the Tupolev design bureau over a career spanning almost seventy years.

Born in 1928, Bliznyuk entered the S. Ordzhonikidze Moscow Aviation Institute and was recruited to work at the Tupolev design bureau as a design engineer during his studies. His early work included several military designs, including the Tu-91 turboprop tactical strike aircraft, the Tu-95 and Tu-98 strategic bombers, the Tu-105 prototype for the Tu-22 supersonic long-range bomber, and the Tu-107. From the late 1950s Bliznyuk worked on designs for unmanned aerial vehicles for different purposes, and had a hand in the development of the Tu-121, Tu-123, Tu-141 and Tu-143 unmanned vehicles, as well as some more unconventional designs, the Tu-130 boost-glider and the proposed Tu-136 orbital crewed spacecraft. By the 1960s he was working under the bureau's chief, Aleksey Tupolev, on the design for the Tu-144 supersonic passenger aircraft, and had the title of Deputy Chief Designer.

Using the expertise developed on the production of the Tu-144, Bliznyuk worked to develop the Tu-160, a supersonic bomber which incorporated a number of features developed and perfected on the Tu-144. Bliznyuk was appointed Chief Designer and head of the Tu-160 project in 1975, and shepherded the design through to its first test flight in 1981, and its acceptance into service with the Soviet Air Force in 1987. He continued to refine and develop the design for the rest of his career. Receiving a number of awards over his career, including the USSR State Prize, the Order "For Merit to the Fatherland", 4th class, the Order of the Red Banner of Labour, and the Order of the Badge of Honour, as well as the title of Honoured Aircraft Builder, Bliznyuk remained with Tupolev until his death in 2019, serving as a consultant on the company's senior council. In 2006 the Military Council of 37th Air Army named one of their Tu-160 bombers "Valentin Bliznyuk", in honour of the plane's chief designer.

== Early life and design work ==
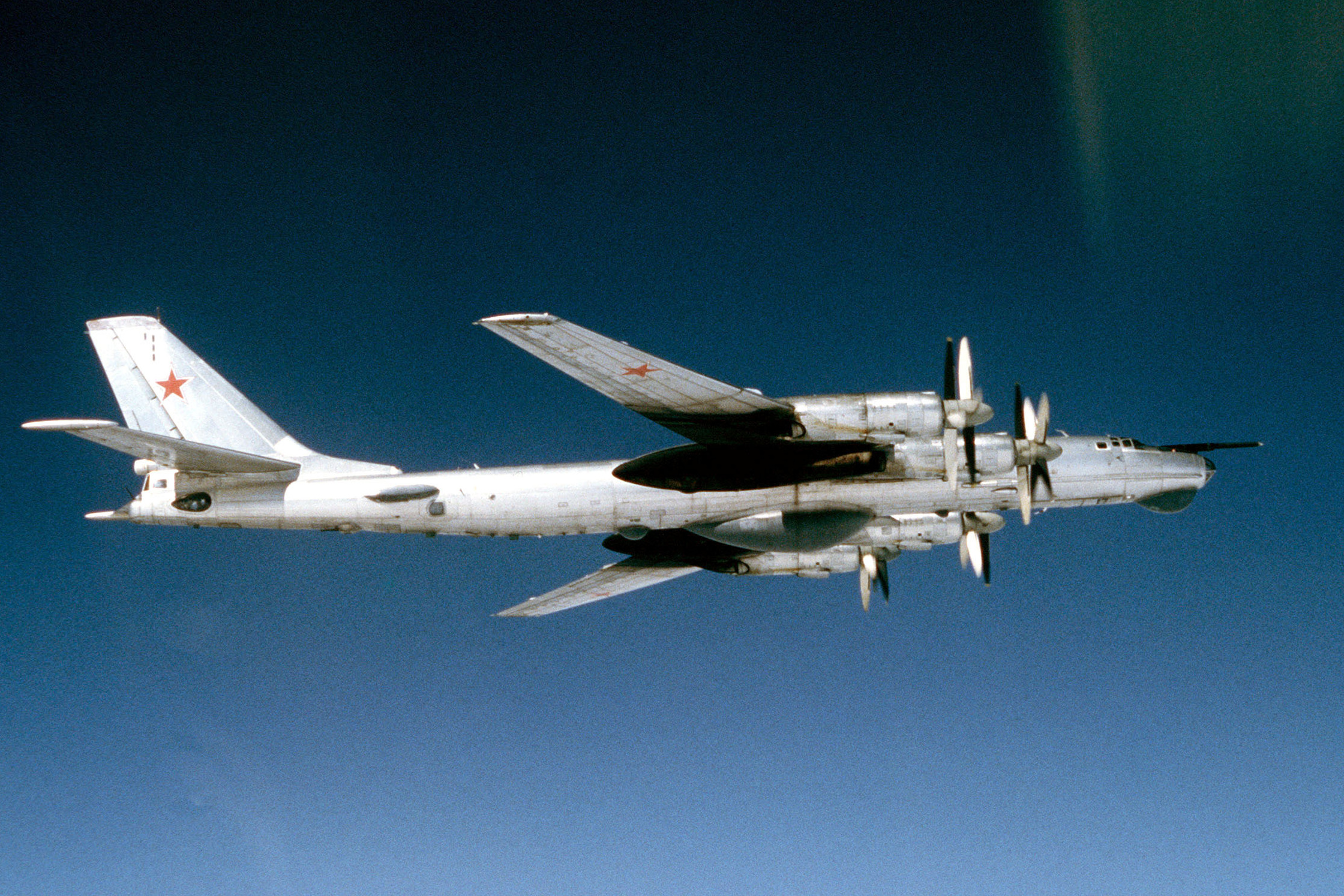
A Tu-95 in flight. One of the early designs Bliznyuk worked on.

Born on 12 April 1928 in the village of Malorossiyskoe, in what was then the Kazakh Autonomous Socialist Soviet Republic, in the Soviet Union, Bliznyuk entered the S. Ordzhonikidze Moscow Aviation Institute after graduating from high school. While studying, he joined the Tupolev design bureau as a design engineer in 1952, before graduating from the Moscow Aviation Institute in 1953. Under the direction of Sergey Yeger, Bliznyuk worked on several of the designs drawn up by the bureau during the 1950s; including the Tu-91 turboprop tactical strike aircraft, the Tu-95 and Tu-98 strategic bombers, the Tu-105 prototype for the Tu-22 supersonic long-range bomber, and the Tu-107, a prototype military transport aircraft.

== Unmanned and experimental vehicles ==
In the late 1950s the Tupolev bureau formed a new unit under Aleksey Tupolev to direct research into unmanned aerial vehicles. From 1957 until 1972 Bliznyuk directly supervised the development of several new unmanned aerial systems; including the Tu-121 supersonic strategic strike aircraft, and the Tu-123, Tu-141 and Tu-143 reconnaissance drones. He also worked on the Tu-130 boost-glider and the proposed Tu-136. The technical breakthroughs involved in this work allowed Tupolev to design and build the Tu-144, an early supersonic passenger aircraft, which first flew in 1968.

== Tu-144 and Tu-160 ==
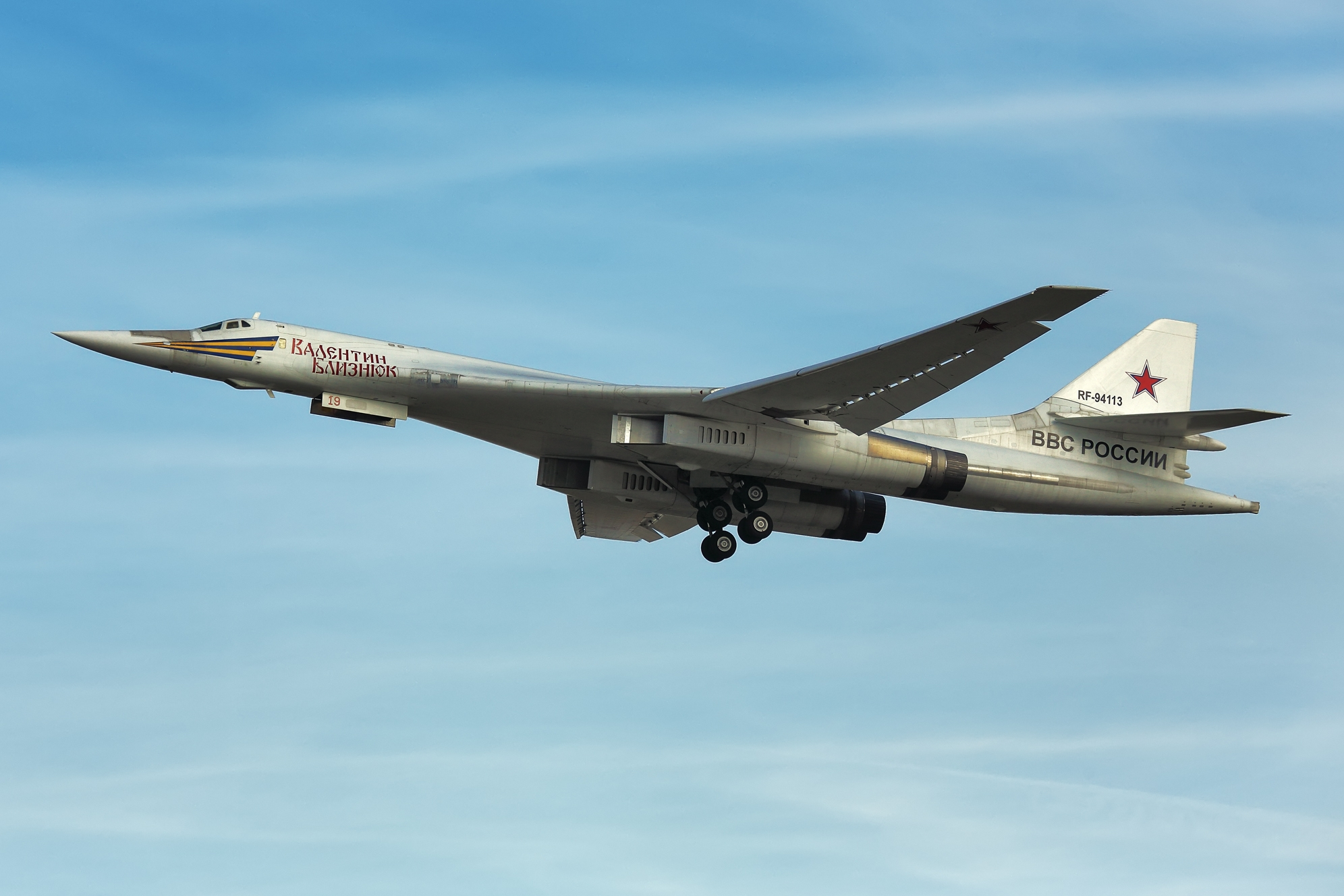
Tu-160 RF-94113 "Valentin Bliznyuk", named for Bliznyuk in 2006

The Tu-144's chief designer was credited as Aleksey Tupolev, with Bliznyuk working under him to coordinate the project's development. Bliznyuk started as head of the brigade, and then became head of the General Views department, with the title of Deputy Chief Designer. He eventually rose to head of the design department, incorporating many of the design features and lessons learnt from the Tu-144 into the development of the long-range supersonic Tu-22M bomber and its many variants. These laid the groundwork for the development of the Tu-160 supersonic bomber. Bliznyuk took part in the preliminary designwork for the Tu-160 during the late 1960s and early 1970s, which resulted in the variable-sweep wing design as used on the Tu-144. In 1975 Bliznyuk was appointed Chief Designer and head of Tu-160 project, and Deputy General Designer of the design bureau. Bliznyuk oversaw the coordination of the different companies and elements involved in the design and construction work, as well as the construction of prototypes and their testing and refinement. The first flight of the prototype Tu-160 was on 18 December 1981. After thorough testing the Tu-160 entered service with the Soviet Air Force in 1987. Bliznyuk continued to work on further refinements and developments to the design for the rest of his career. Tupolev credited Bliznyuk as a designer who "not only carried out the general management of the project, but also directly supervised the development of the aerodynamic design of the aircraft, its power plant, including many innovative developments."

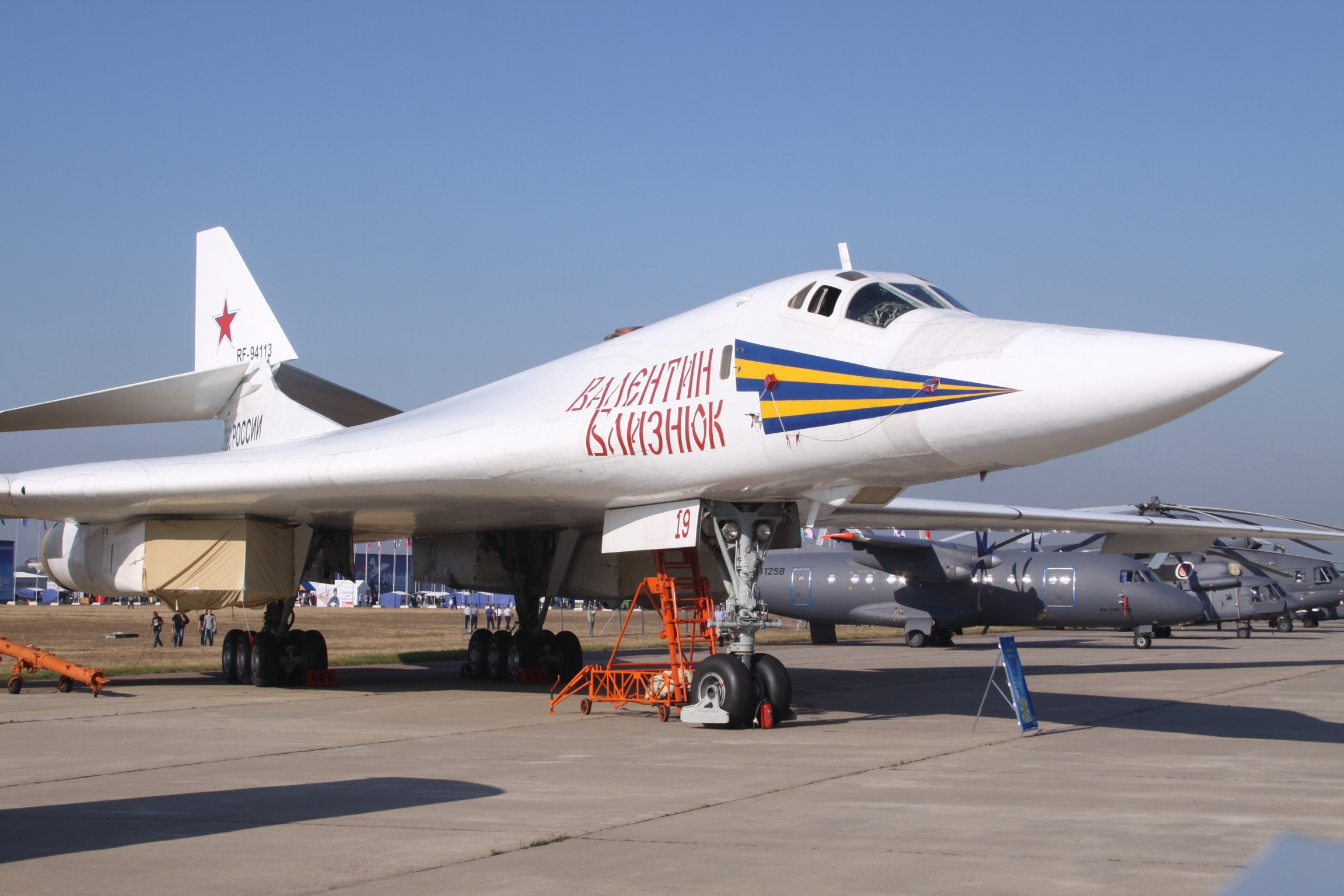
RF-94113 "Valentin Bliznyuk" at MAKS in 2012

Bliznyuk also led the development of the Tu-330, a medium-sized cargo plane developed from the Tu-204 and Tu-214 commercial designs. In later life Bliznyuk was a consultant for Tupolev's senior council. Bliznyuk died on 30 December 2019 at the age of 91. The Tupolev design bureau announced his death, and recorded that "he was an outstanding aviation designer, a talented organizer, a responsive and attentive leader and friend. Valentin Ivanovich made an invaluable contribution to the development of the domestic aircraft industry. He created projects and put them into practice, investing his energy, knowledge and strength, his sincere love for aviation and faith in its prospects."

== Honours and awards ==
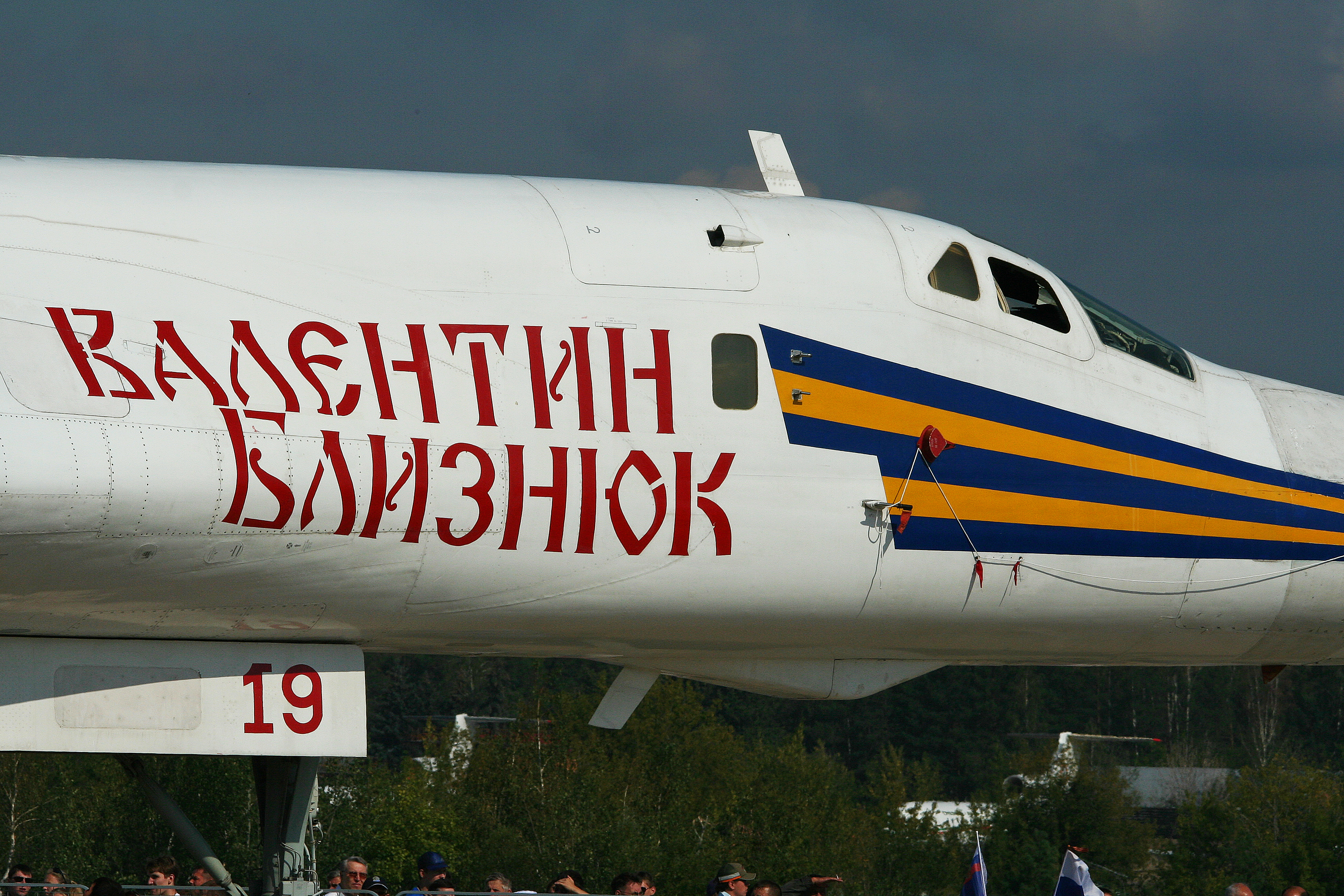
Bliznyuk's name emblazoned on the Tu-160 bomber named for him

Over his career Bliznyuk was awarded the USSR State Prize, and the title of Honoured Aircraft Builder. He also received the Order "For Merit to the Fatherland", 4th class, the Order of the Red Banner of Labour, and the Order of the Badge of Honour. In 2006 the Military Council of 37th Air Army named one of their Tu-160 bombers, identification number 19, "Valentin Bliznyuk".

== Memory ==
In 2006 the Military Council of 37th Air Army named one of their Tu-160 bombers in service with the Russian Air Force (tail number 19) "Valentin Bliznyuk".
