= Motor transport =

Operation and maintenance of a military vehicle fleet

Motor transport (MT) refers to the operation and maintenance of a military vehicle fleet (especially trucks), and sometimes to the servicemembers to operate and maintain them. Traditionally, motor transport organizations are responsible for a unit's military trucks and associated equipment, as well as the transport of personnel and material from one place to another.

== Tactics ==
=== Logistics ===
In military logistics, it is concerned with maintaining army supply lines with food, armaments, ammunitions, and spare parts apart from the transportation of troops themselves. In Motor Transport, Trucks move supplies from location to location.

=== Artillery tractor ===
An artillery tractor, also referred to as a gun tractor, is a specialized heavy-duty form of tractor unit used to tow artillery pieces of varying weights and calibres. It may be wheeled, tracked, or half-tracked.

== Vehicles ==
=== United States ===
==== Family of Medium Tactical Vehicles ====
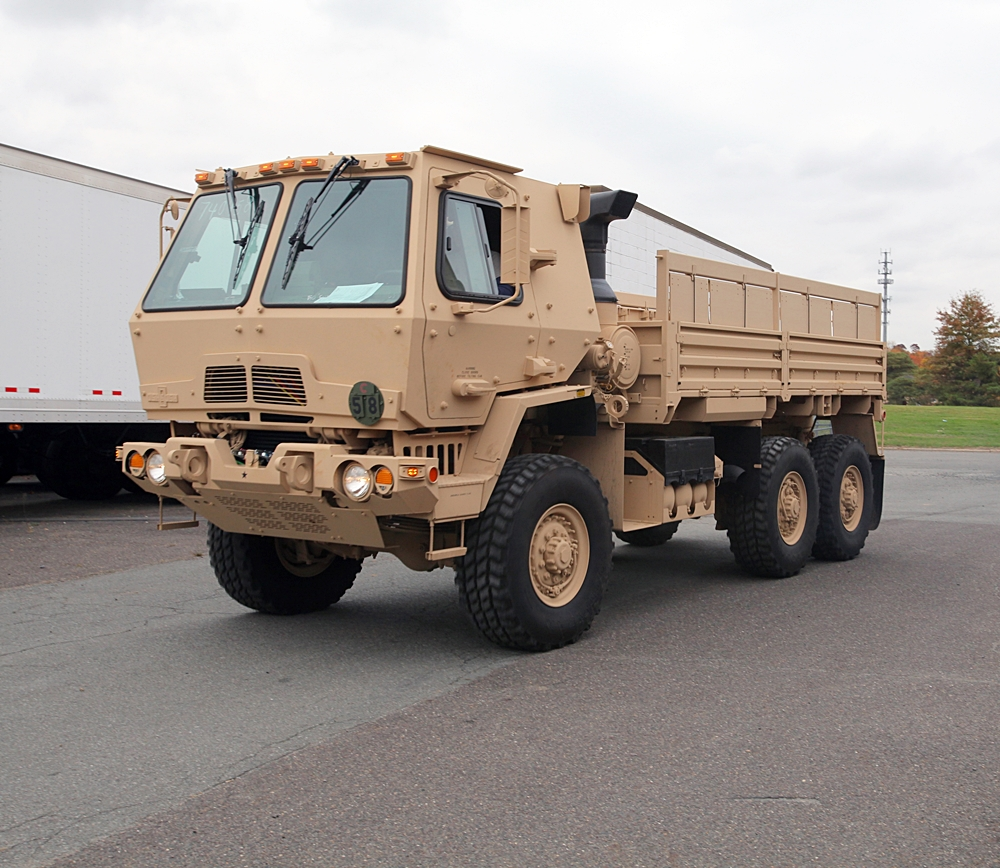
An Oshkosh-produced M1083 A1P2 5-ton MTV in A-kit configuration

The Family of Medium Tactical Vehicles (FMTV) are a series of military vehicles based upon a common chassis, varying by payload and mission requirements. The FMTV is derived from the Austrian Steyr 12M18 truck, but substantially modified to meet United States Army requirements. These include a minimum 50 percent U.S. content.

==== M939 ====
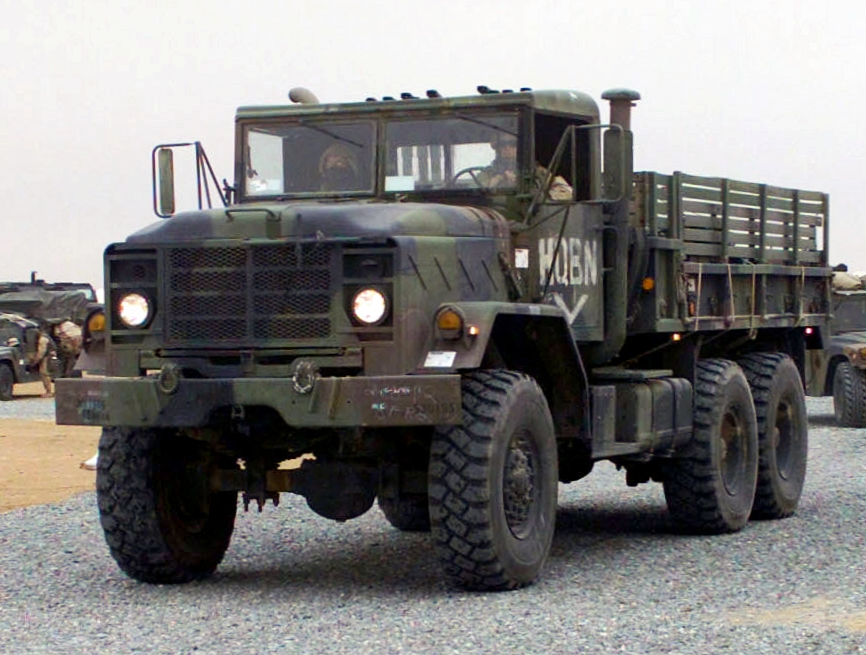
United States Marine Corps M923A1 in 2003

The M939 is a 5-ton 6×6 U.S. military heavy truck. The basic cargo versions were designed to transport a 10,000 pounds (4,500 kg) cargo load over all terrain in all weather. Designed in the late 1970s to replace the M39 and M809 series of trucks, it has been in service ever since. The M939 evolved into its own family of cargo trucks, dump trucks, semi-tractors, vans, wreckers, and bare chassis/cabs for specialty bodies. 44,590 in all were produced.

==== M809 ====
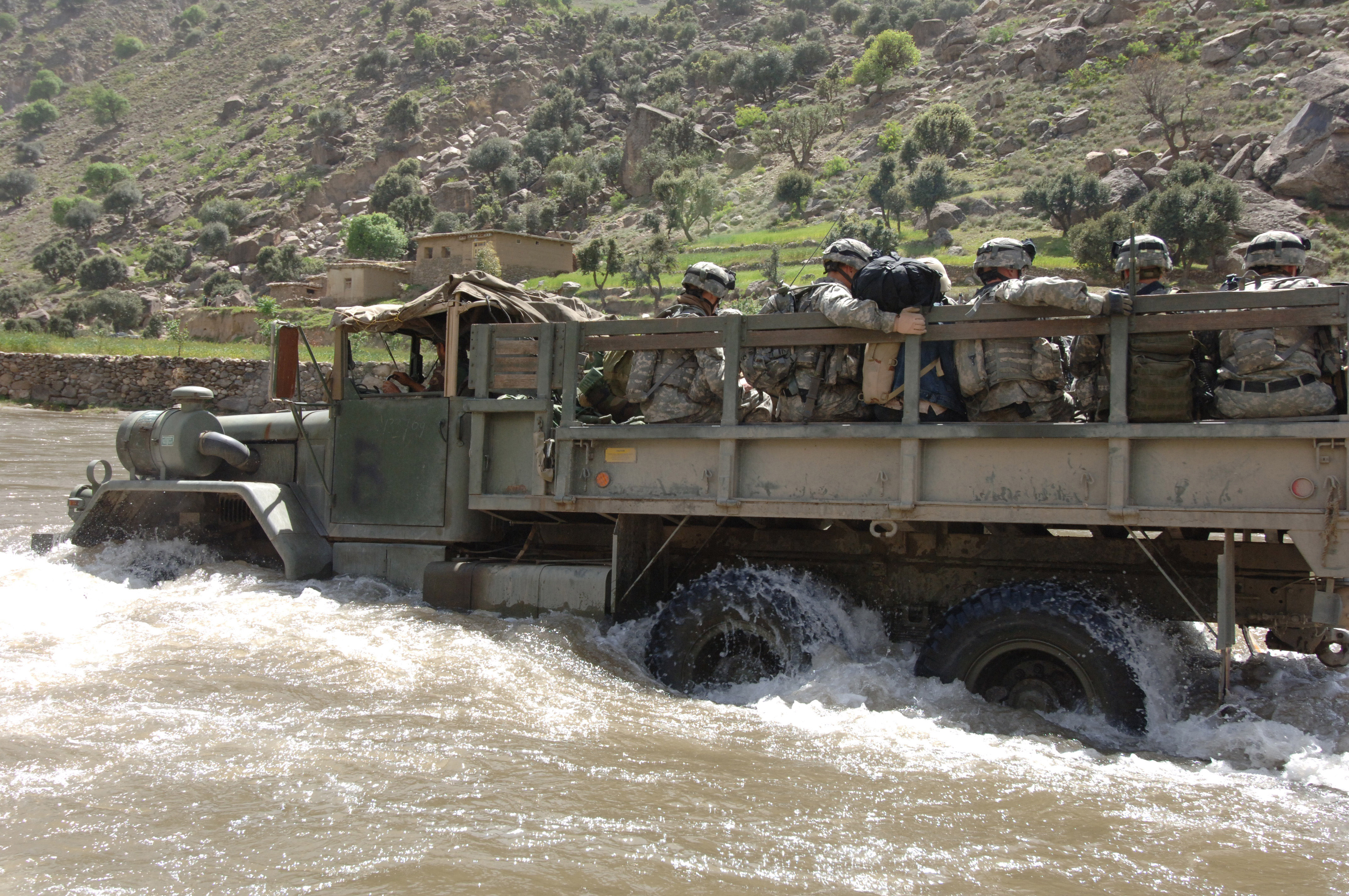
M813 crossing a river

The M809 Series 5-ton 6x6 truck (G908) was a family of heavy tactical trucks built for the United States Armed Forces. The basic cargo version was designed to transport a 5-ton (4,500 kg), 14 ft (4.3 m) long load over all terrain in all weather. In on-road service the load weight was doubled. Built by AM General, they evolved into the M939 Series.

==== M35 ====
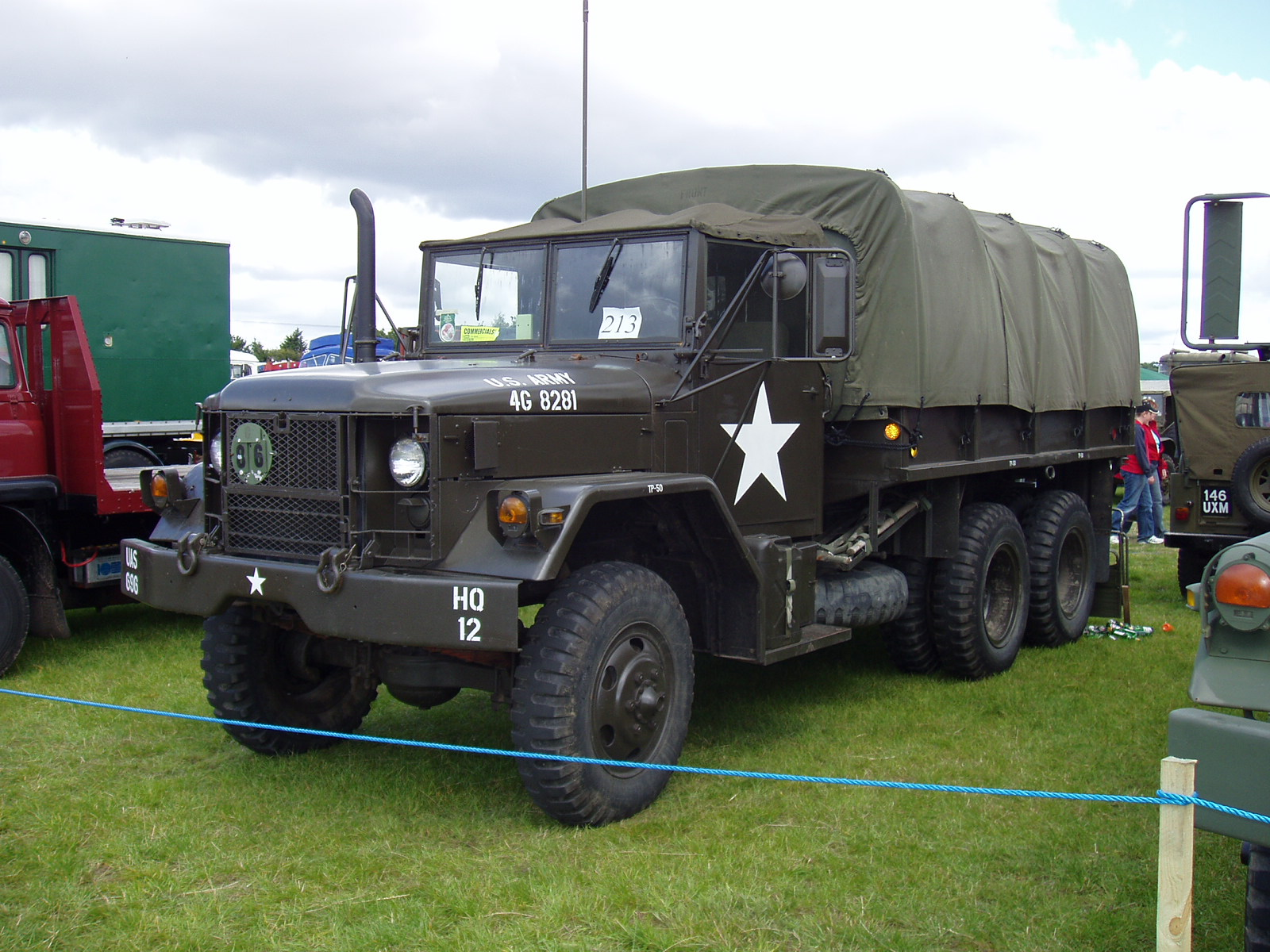
An M35 2½-ton cargo truck

The M35 2½-ton cargo truck is a long-lived 2½-ton 6×6 cargo truck initially used by the United States Army and subsequently utilized by many nations around the world. Over time it evolved into a family of specialized vehicles. It inherited the nickname "Deuce and a Half" from an older 2½-ton truck, the World War II GMC CCKW.

The M35 started as a 1949 M34 REO Motor Car Company design for a 2½-ton 6×6 off-road truck. This original 6-wheel M34 version with a single wheel tandem was quickly superseded by the 10-wheel M35 design with a dual tandem. The basic M35 cargo truck is rated to carry 5,000 pounds (2,300 kg) off-road or 10,000 pounds (4,500 kg) on roads. Trucks in this weight class are considered medium duty by the military and the Department of Transportation.

==== Medium Tactical Vehicle Replacement ====
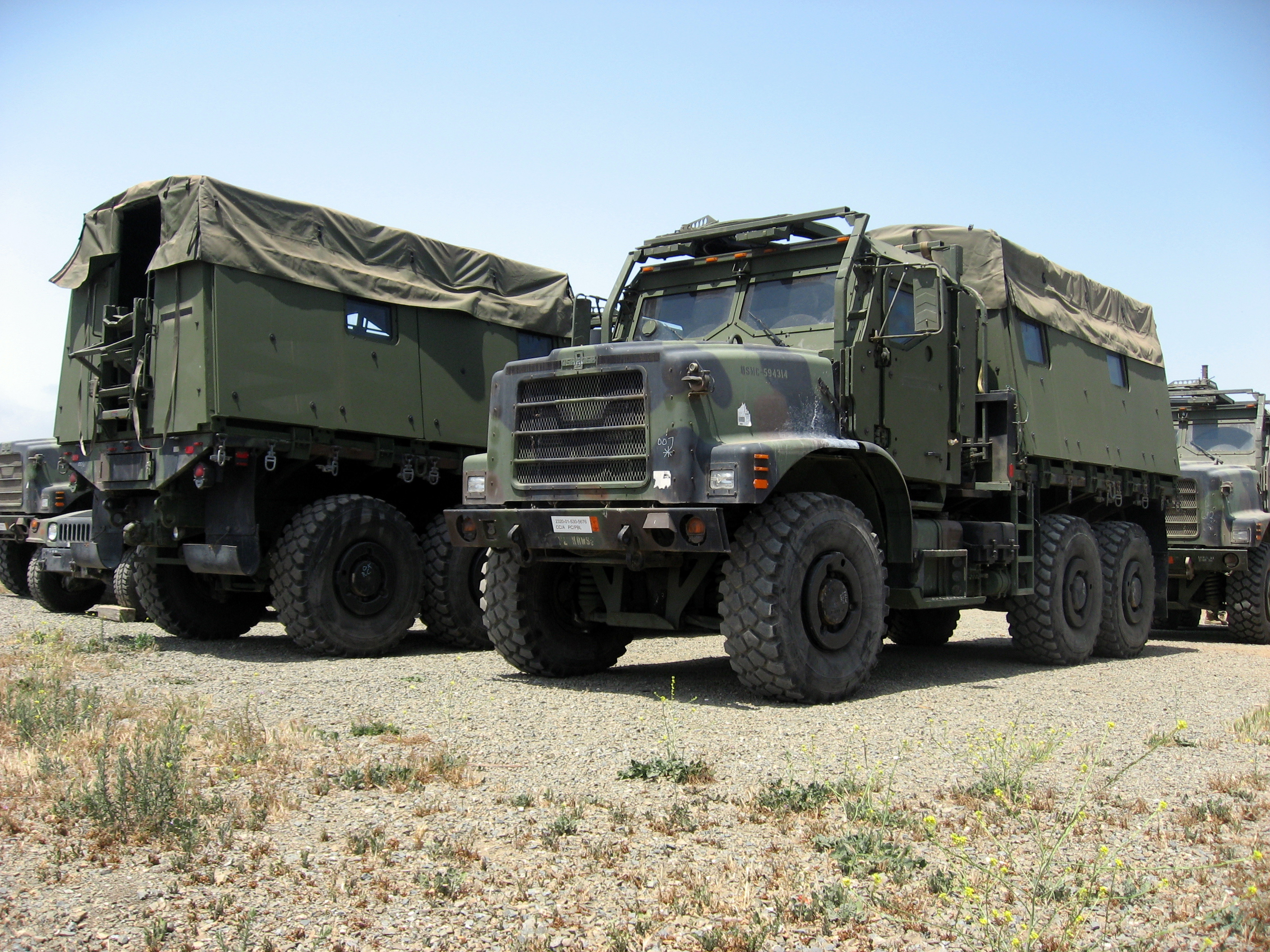
MTVR MK23 standard cargo trucks with Armor Protection Kits (APKs) and armored rear troop carrier compartments

The Medium Tactical Vehicle Replacement (MTVR) is a family of medium to heavy six-wheel drive cargo and tactical trucks, used by the United States Marine Corps. The first MTVRs were delivered in late 1999. The MTVR is the equivalent of the U.S. Army's Family of Medium Tactical Vehicles (FMTV); the Marines do not use the FMTV (with the exception of the FMTV-based HIMARS) and the Army does not use the MTVR.

There were originally four, later seven, MTVR variants, then nine (plus a sub-variant) as deliveries and development continued. A dedicated trailer and prototype/developmental MTVRs have also been produced.

The MTVR was designed and is manufactured by Oshkosh Defense.

==== Heavy Expanded Mobility Tactical Truck ====
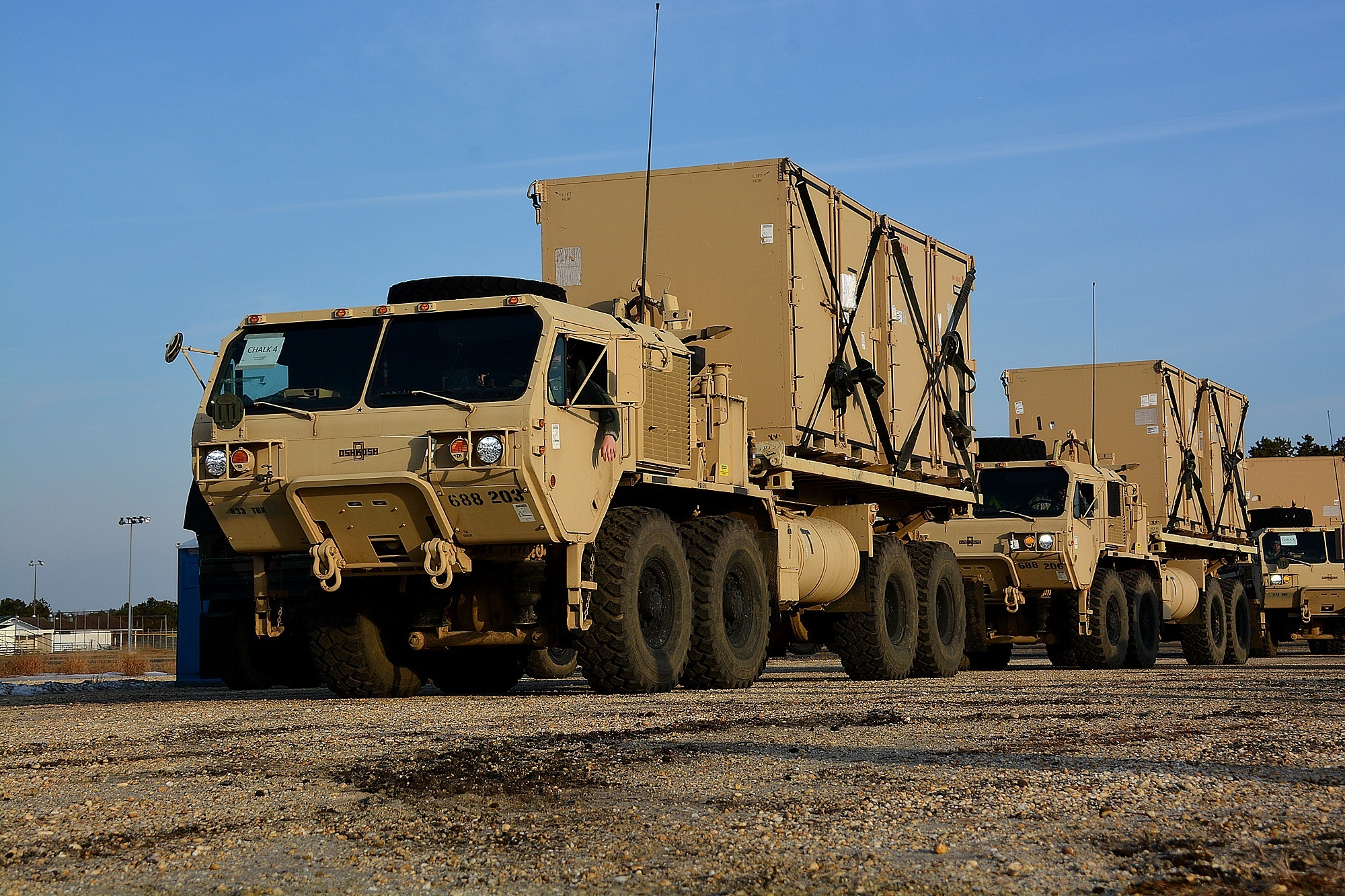
HEMTT M1120A4 in B-kit configuration

The Heavy Expanded Mobility Tactical Truck (HEMTT) is an eight-wheel drive, diesel-powered, 10-short-ton (9,100 kg) tactical truck. The M977 HEMTT entered service in 1982 with the United States Army as a replacement for the M520 Goer, and has remained in production for the U.S. Army and other nations. By Q2 2021, around 35,800 HEMTTs in various configurations had been produced by Oshkosh Defense through new-build contracts and around 14,000 of them had been re-manufactured. Latest variants have the A4 suffix.

The 10×10 Logistic Vehicle System Replacement (LVSR) is the United States Marines Corps' (USMC) equivalent to the U.S. Army's 8×8 HEMTT and 10×10 Palletized Load System (PLS). The USMC does not use the HEMTT or PLS, and the Army does not use the LVSR, but both services use a common trailer (M1076) with all three truck types.

==== Logistics Vehicle System ====
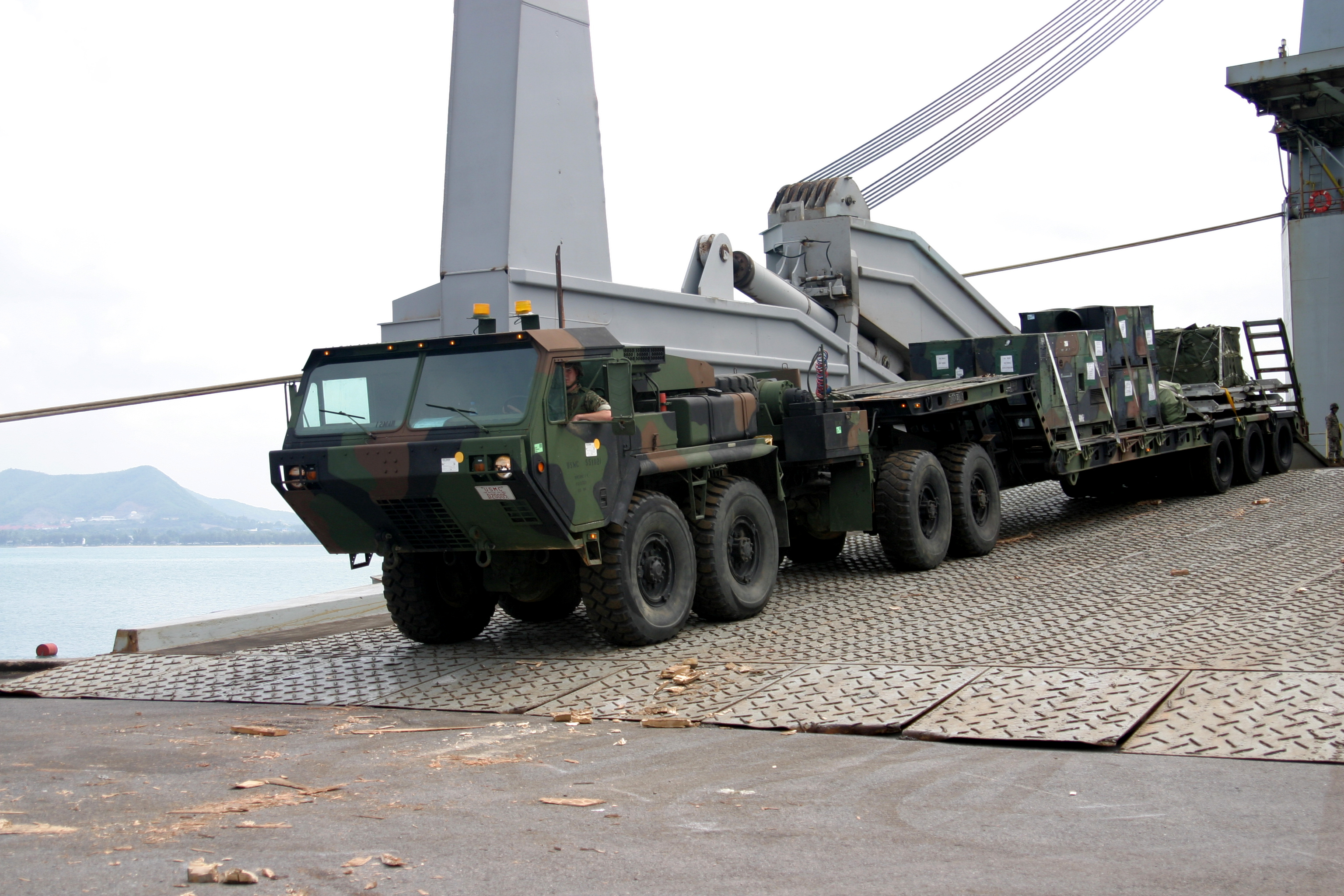
LVS fifth-wheel variant, towing an M870A2 semitrailer

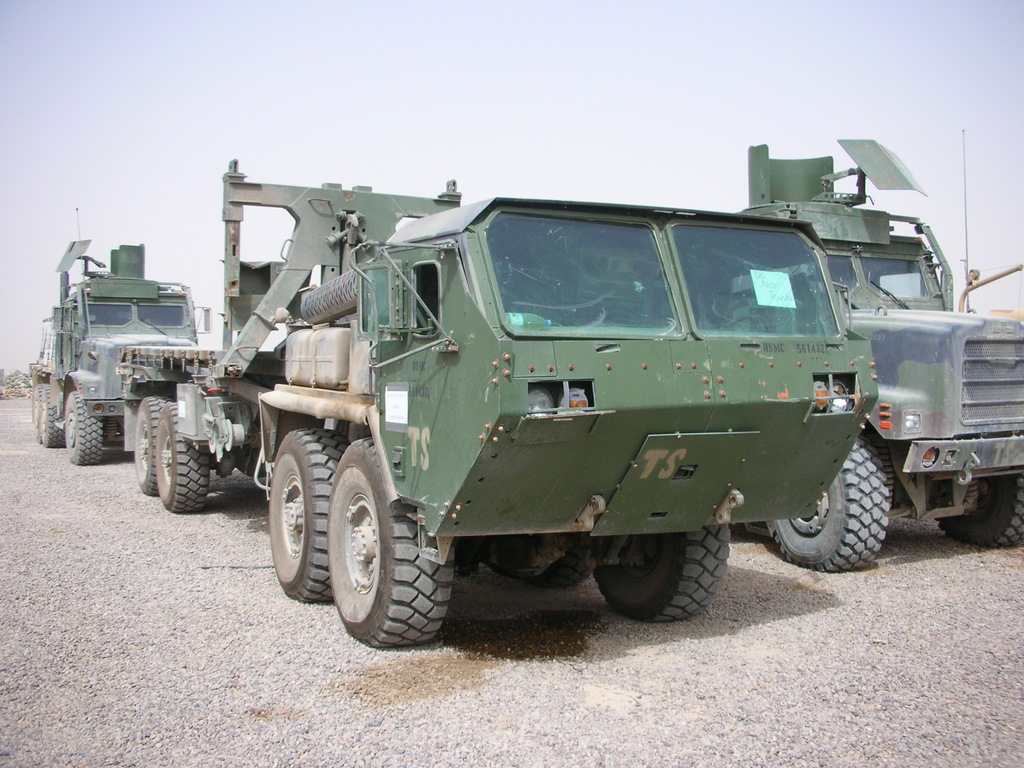
LVS self-loader variant (MK48/18A1) with MAK Armor-kit

The Logistics Vehicle System (LVS) is a modular assortment of eight-wheel drive all-terrain vehicle unit combinations used by the United States Marine Corps. It is nicknamed "Dragon Wagon", which is a reference to the famous M25 tank transporter.

The LVS was fielded in 1985 as the Marine Corps heavy tactical vehicle system. It was designed and manufactured by the Oshkosh Corporation. The United States Army does not use the LVS, it uses the Heavy Expanded Mobility Tactical Truck (HEMTT). The key differences between the two is the LVS's ability to interchange Front Power Units with Rear Body Units. The LVS also steers through both standard wheel pivoting (as on a typical automobile) and hydraulic yaw steering (by articulating the Front Power Unit against the Rear Body Unit). This enabled the LVS to meet the turning radius requirements of the U.S. Marines. LVS is rated to haul up to 22.5 tonnes (50,000 lb) on highways.

The Oshkosh Logistic Vehicle System Replacement (LVSR) is the replacement for the LVS and was first fielded in 2009.

==== RMMV HX ====
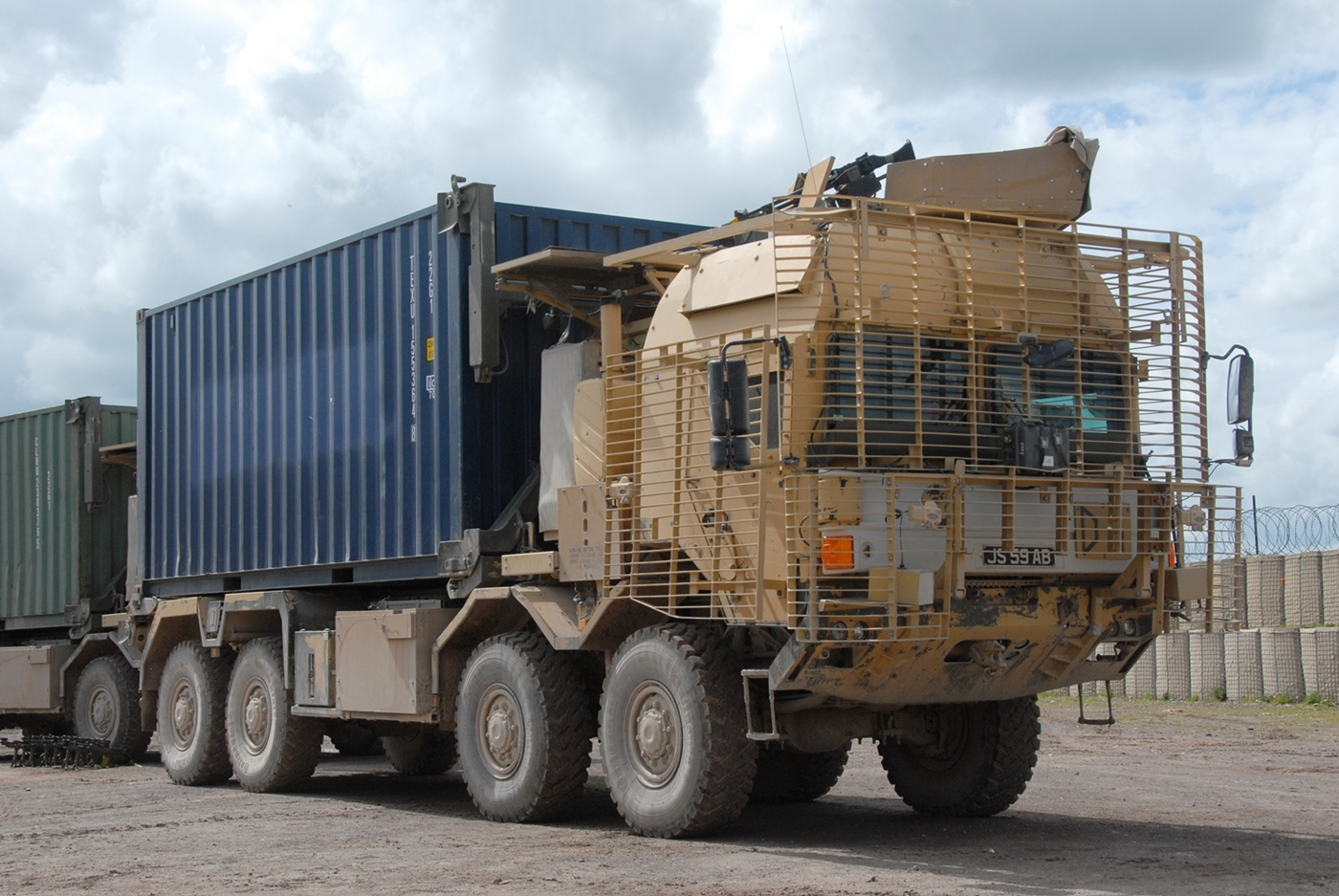
A British Army HX77 (8×8) EPLS with Project Fortress protection upgrade. Under a contract awarded in 2018 382 HX77 were retrofitted to EPLS configuration

The HX family are a range of purpose-designed tactical military trucks manufactured by Rheinmetall MAN Military Vehicles (RMMV). The HX range was announced in 2003, and the first order was placed in 2004. The HX range replaced the earlier FX and LX ranges in production.

The HX2 range, which as of 2024 complements the original HX range, was announced in 2012. The first HX2 range trucks were delivered in April 2016. The HX and HX2 ranges originally complemented the SX range. In 2019, they replaced the SX range as the type was no longer produced.

The HX3 range was announced in May 2021, with series production scheduled from 2027.

==== Navistar 7000 series ====
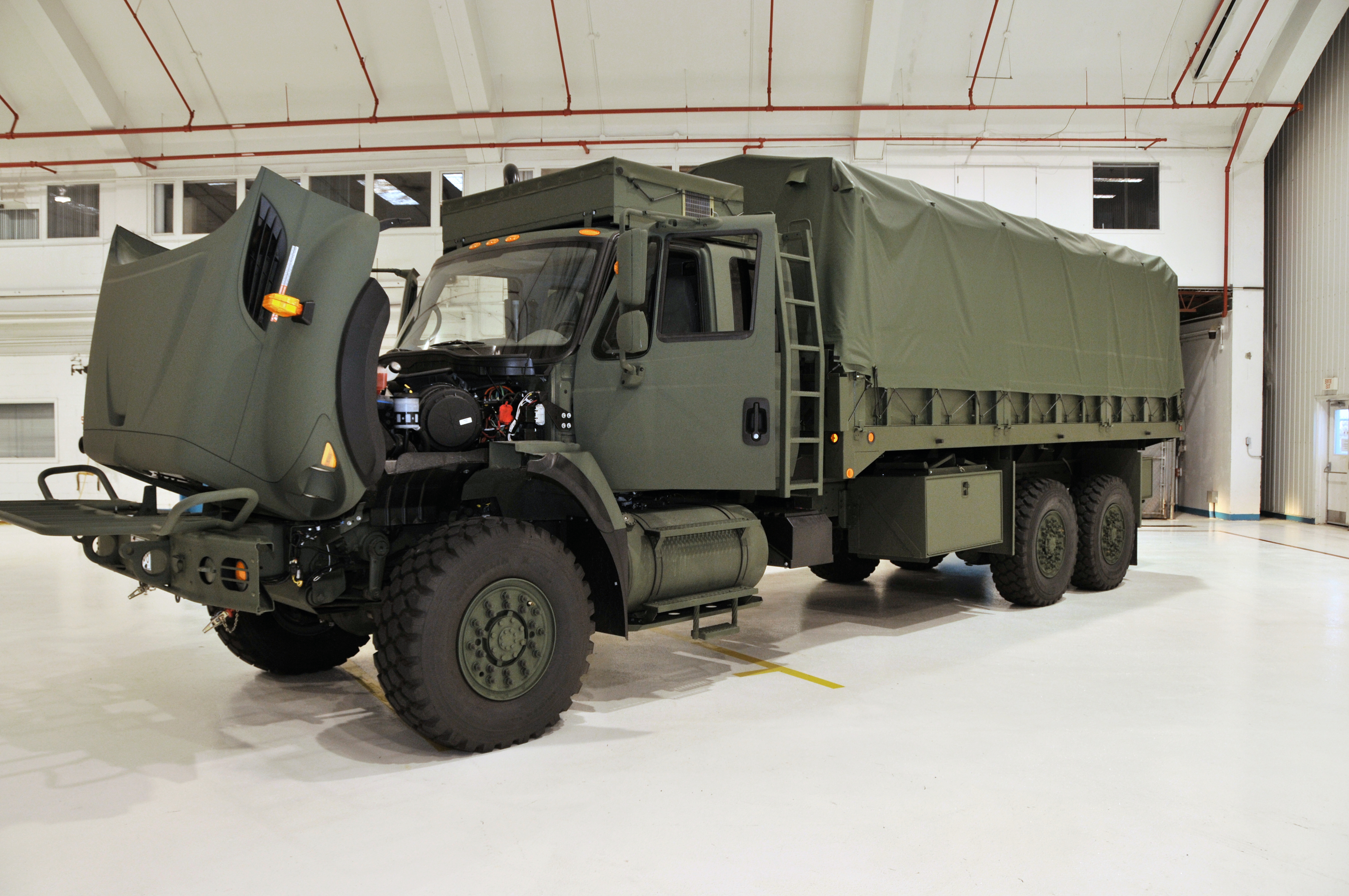
A parked 7000-MV 4 1/2 ton cargo truck

The Navistar 7000 series is a line of military heavy lift vehicles based on Navistar International's WorkStar truck chassis, and produced by Navistar Defense. The truck is available in a variety of wheel (4×2, 4×4, 6×4, and 6×6) and engine configurations.

In 2005, the US Army ordered 2,900 7000-MV Series for the Afghan National Army and Iraqi Ministry of Defense and an additional order of 7,000 was added in 2008.

The Canadian Army had adopted the Navistar Defence LLC Medium Logistics truck. The vehicle fulfills the MSVS MilCOTS (Militarized Commercial-Off-The-Shelf) requirement. As of mid-July 2015, the MSVS SMP (Standard Military Pattern) vehicle had been chosen. Starting in June 2010, 1,300 Navistar units replaced part of the MLVW fleet. The civilian designation of the 7000-MV is Navistar 7400 SFA 6×6 and International WorkStar.

In July 2012, the order for 1500 MSVS SMP trucks was cancelled and re-evaluated. In July 2015, Canada awarded the SMP contract to Mack Trucks instead. Mack began delivery of Kerax-series trucks in 2017 and completed delivery by the end of 2018.

=== USSR ===
==== Gaz-66 ====
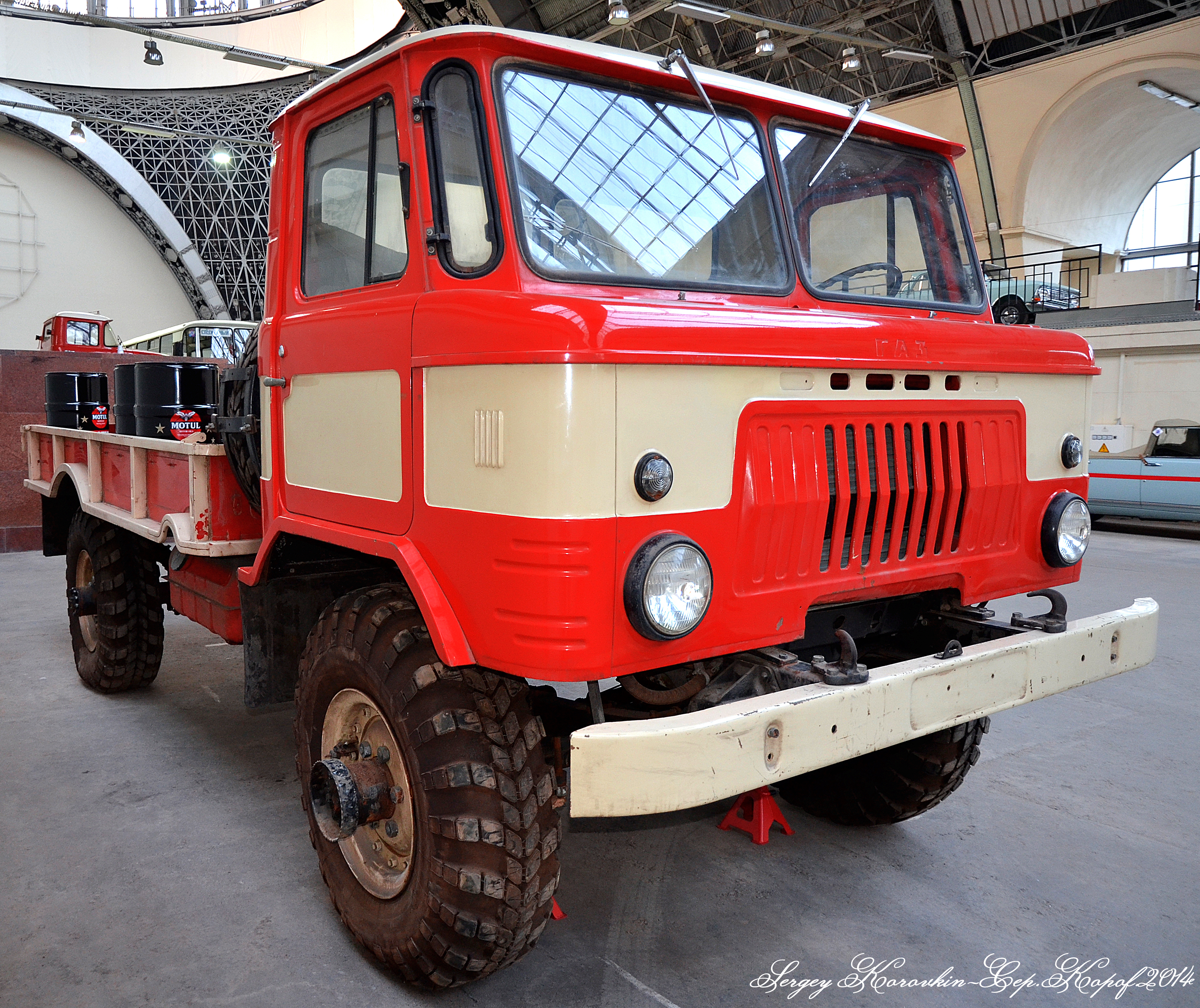

The GAZ-66 is a Soviet and later Russian 4x4 all-road (off-road) military truck produced by GAZ. It was one of the main cargo vehicles for motorized infantry of the Soviet Army and is still employed in former Soviet Union countries. It is nicknamed shishiga (шишига), shisharik (шишарик)/shehsherik (шешерик), trueman (in Siberia).

==== KrAZ-214 ====
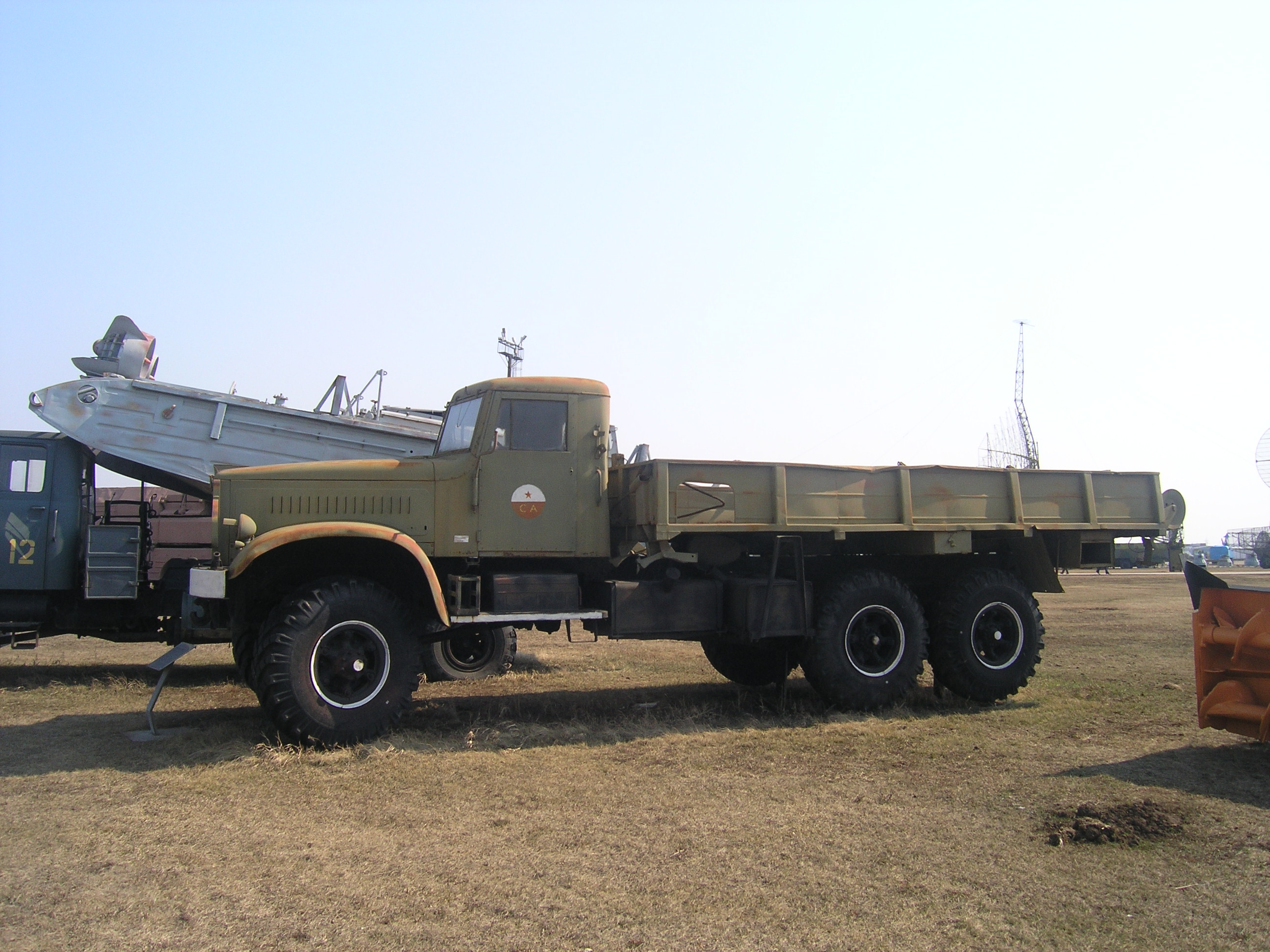

The KrAZ-214 is an off-road truck 6x6 for extreme operations. It was manufactured in the Soviet Union at the YaMZ plant from 1956-1959, after which production was moved to KrAZ. The model line was the successor to the YaG-10 trucks.

==== KrAZ-235 ====
The KrAZ-255 was developed directly from its predecessor, the KrAZ-214 (produced 1956-1967). Despite being very similar at first glance (both using the same cab, flatbed as well as the suspension), there are few major differences. Firstly, the 255 used new and much more powerful engine - the YaMZ-238 (same used in MT-LB tracked APC), replacing the previously used and sensibly weaker YaAZ-206B which was used in 214. The 255 also featured new and more reliable transmission, the YaMZ-236N, instead of the previously used YaAZ-204. It also featured new headlights (which were now, together with turn signals, located in their own housings mounted on the fenders) and, most notably, much wider tires (1300 x 530 x 533 in dimensions), which offered lighter ground pressure and thus, even greater off-road capabilities when compared to its predecessor

==== KrAZ-260 ====
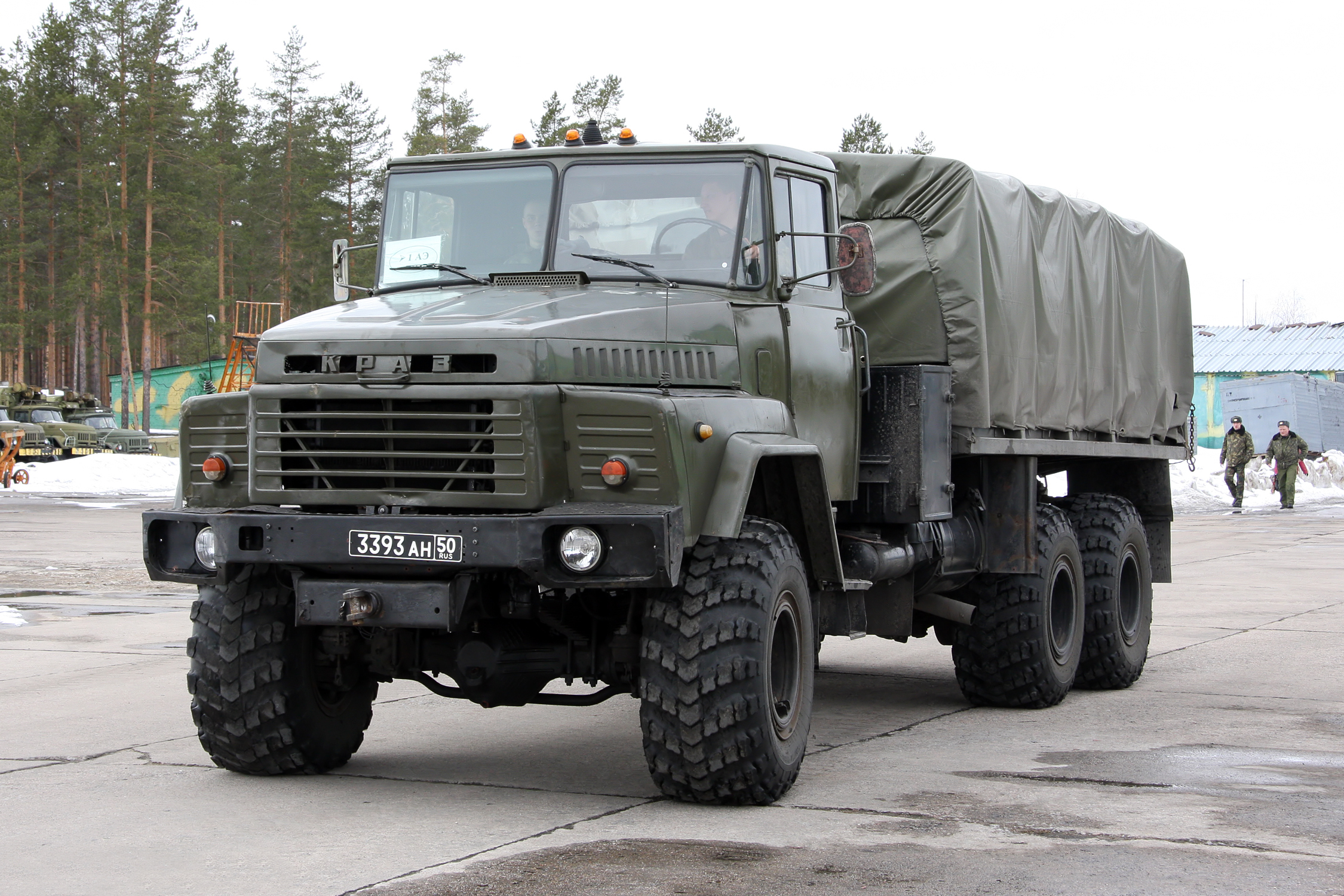

The KrAZ-260 is an off-road truck 6x6 for extreme operations. It was manufactured at the KrAZ plant.

==== KZKT-7428 ====
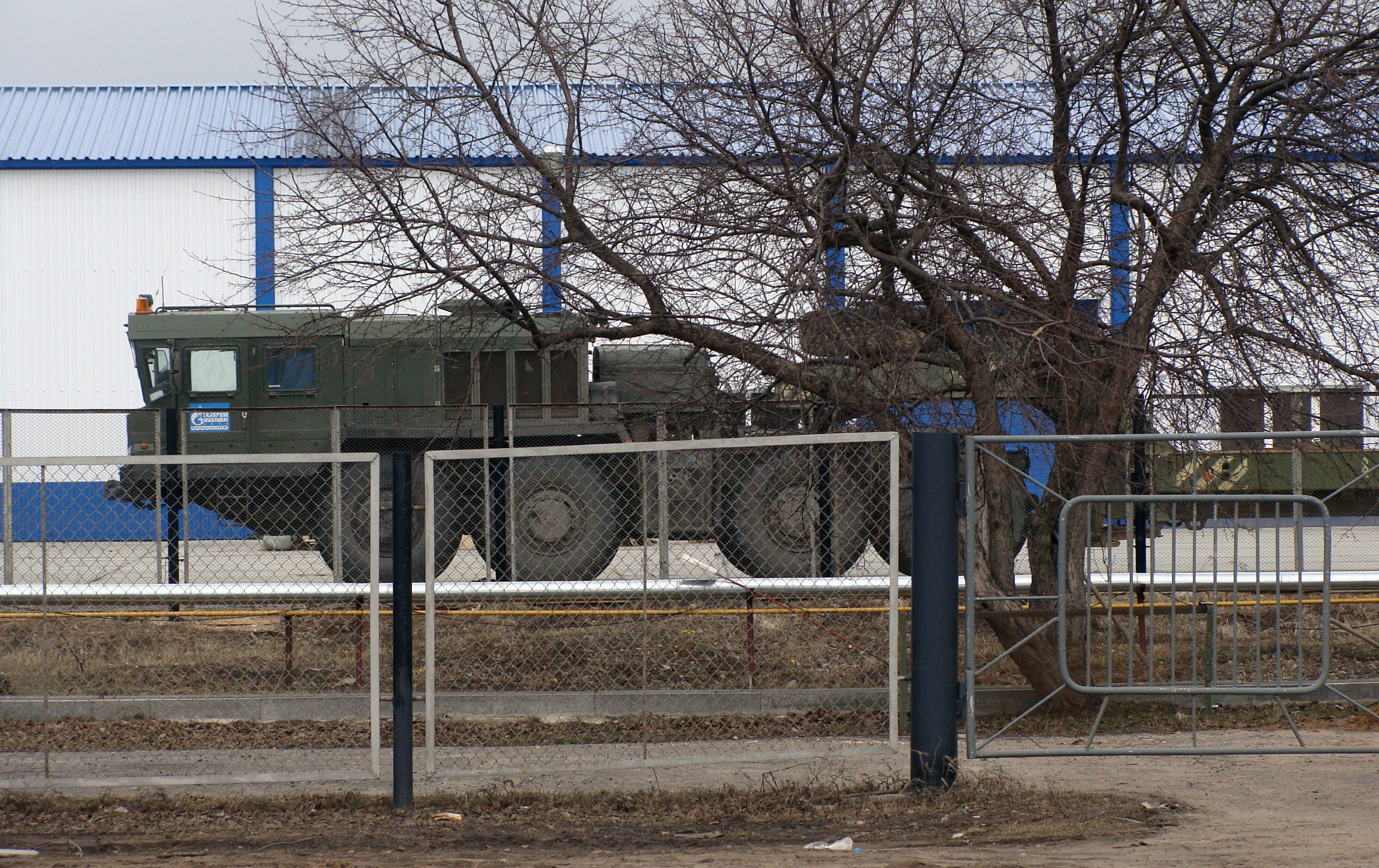
KZKT-7428

The KZKT-7428 Rusich tank transporter artillery tractor was developed as a successor to the MAZ-537 by KZKT. It can haul semi-trailers loads up to 70 t, both on and off-road. It entered service with the Soviet Army in 1990.

==== MAZ-535 ====
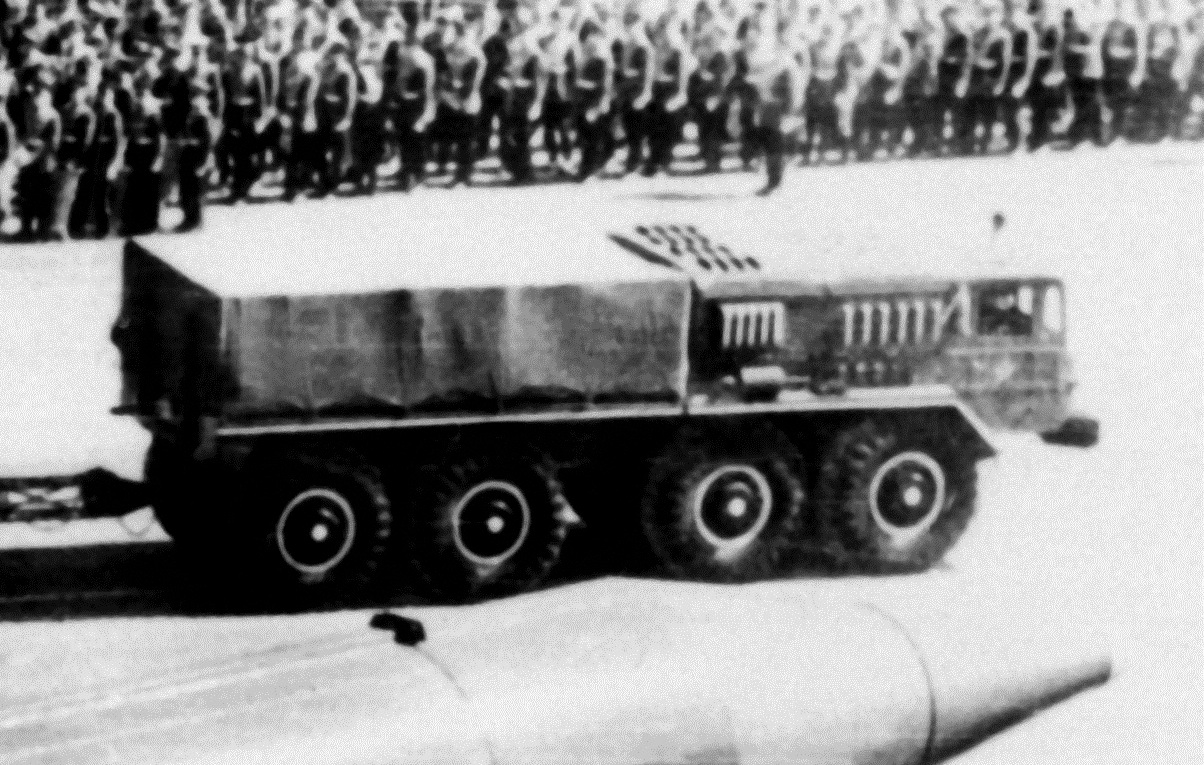
MAZ-535 military heavy tractor

MAZ-535 is a family of heavy four-axle (8x8) tractor trucks developed between 1954 and 1959 by the Special Design Bureau of the Minsk Automobile Plant under the direction of B. L. Shaposhnik. From 1958 to 1961, they were produced at the Minsk plant, and from 1961, production was transferred to the Kurgan Wheel Tractor Plant, where they were manufactured until 1964, when they were replaced by the more powerful MAZ-537 family of tractors.

The design of the MAZ-535 featured several distinctive technical solutions, including: a trough-shaped frame with Z-shaped side members, independent suspension of all single-wheel drive wheels, bogey-type axle arrangement, steerable wheels of the front bogey, central tire inflation system, hydromechanical transmission, inter-axle and inter-wheel self-locking differentials, all-metal four-seat cabin, power steering, pneumatic-hydraulic brake system, as well as a third headlight with infrared illumination in the center of the cabin for use with night vision devices.

MAZ-535 tractors were widely used in the Strategic Rocket Forces of the Reserve of the Supreme High Command for transporting ballistic missiles. It was in this role that the vehicle was often seen during numerous military parades on Red Square. On the MAZ-535B chassis, prototype launchers for the tactical missiles "Onega" and "Ladoga" were developed. The MAZ-535V towed launchers for the short-range missile complex "Temp" and unmanned aircraft Tu-121 and Tu-123 (DBR "Yastreb-1").

==== MAZ-537 ====
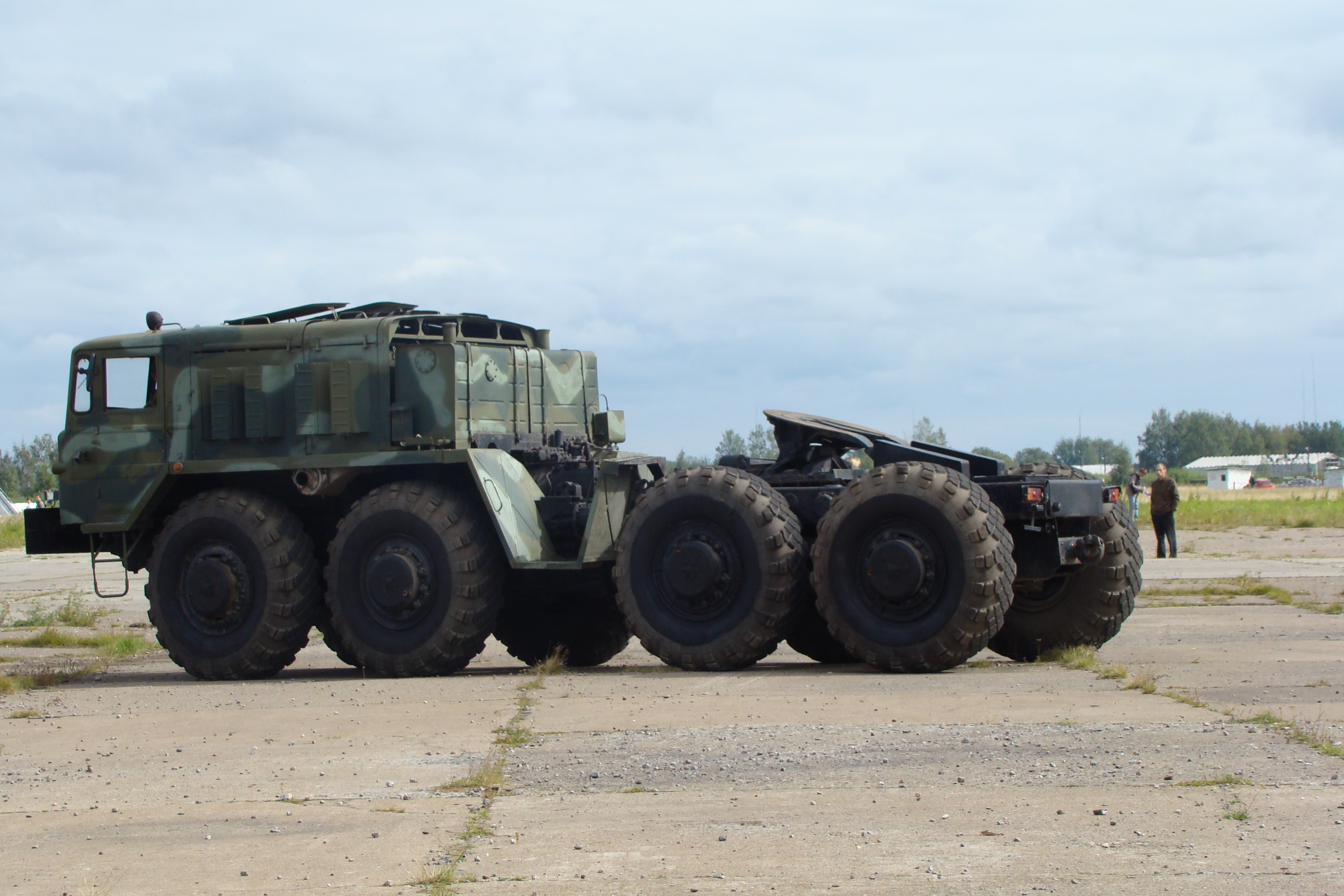

The MAZ-537 is a 12-cylinder diesel engine-powered military truck artillery tractor, originally designed for loads up to 50 tons (using semitrailers such as the ChMZAP-9990 or ChMZAP-5247G, for example) with later versions providing a maximum load of 65 tons. It was manufactured by the Minsk Automobile Plant (from 1959 to 1965) and the Kurgan Wheel Tractor Plant from 1963 until halt of production in 1990.

==== Ural-375 ====
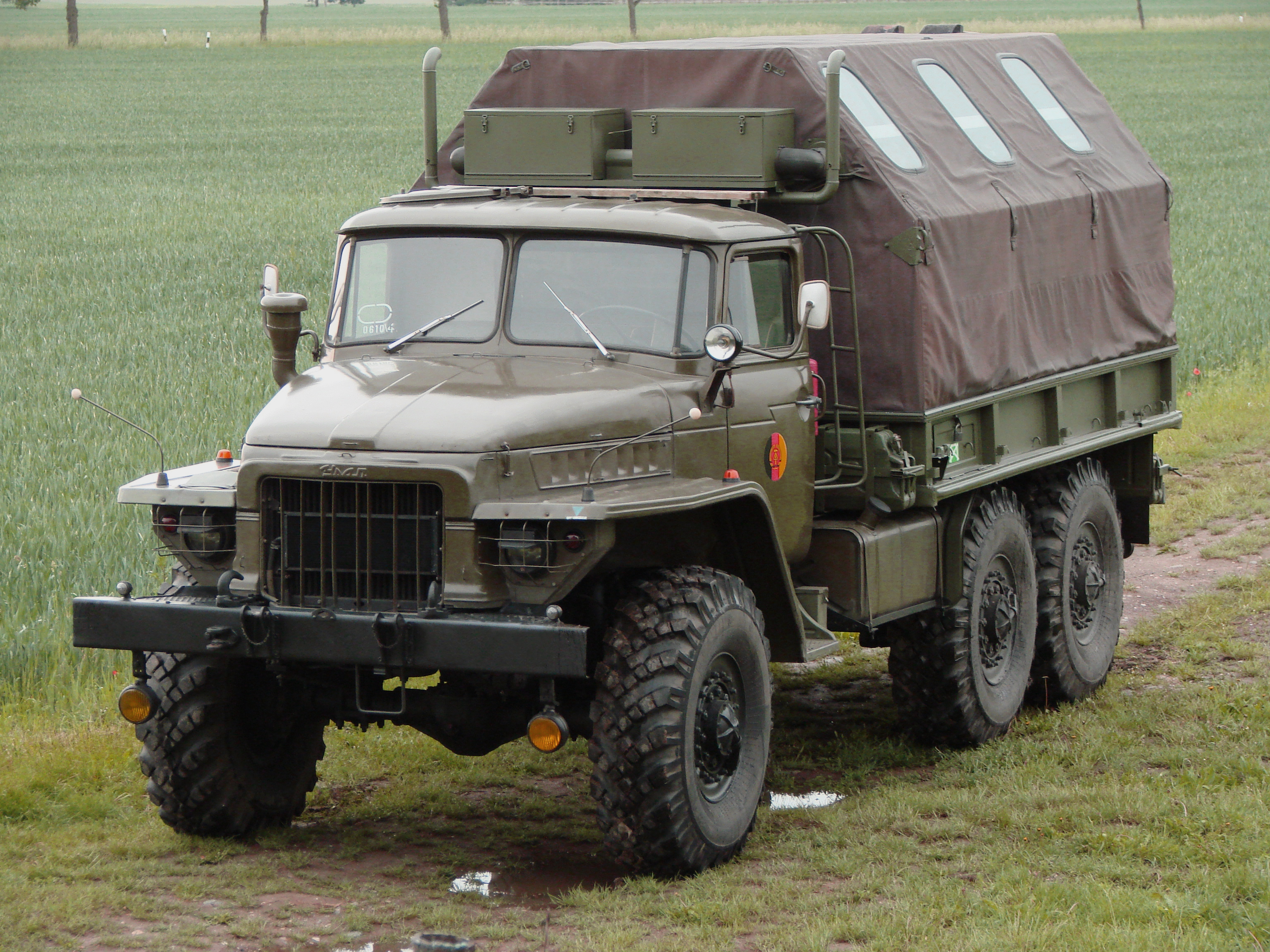

The Ural-375 is a general purpose 4.5 ton 6×6 truck produced at the Ural Automotive Plant in the Russian SFSR from 1961 to 1993. The Ural-375 replaced the ZIL-157 as the standard Soviet Army truck in 1979, and was replaced by the Ural-4320.

The Ural-375 was used, for example, as a platform for the BM-21 Grad rocket launcher, as a troop carrier, and as a supply carrier.

The Ural-375 was developed during the 1950s-1960s and used many chassis components from the MAZ-200 truck, the Ural-375 used a 7.0 liter V8 engine, the design of which was based on the 6.0 liter V8 engine from the ZIL-130 truck, and most parts are interchangeable between the truck engines. The increase in displacement was achieved by increasing the bore of the cylinders to 108 mm, while the piston stroke of 95 mm was preserved. The engine block between the trucks was the same, as was the crankshafts, with the main difference being the pistons.

==== Ural-4320 ====
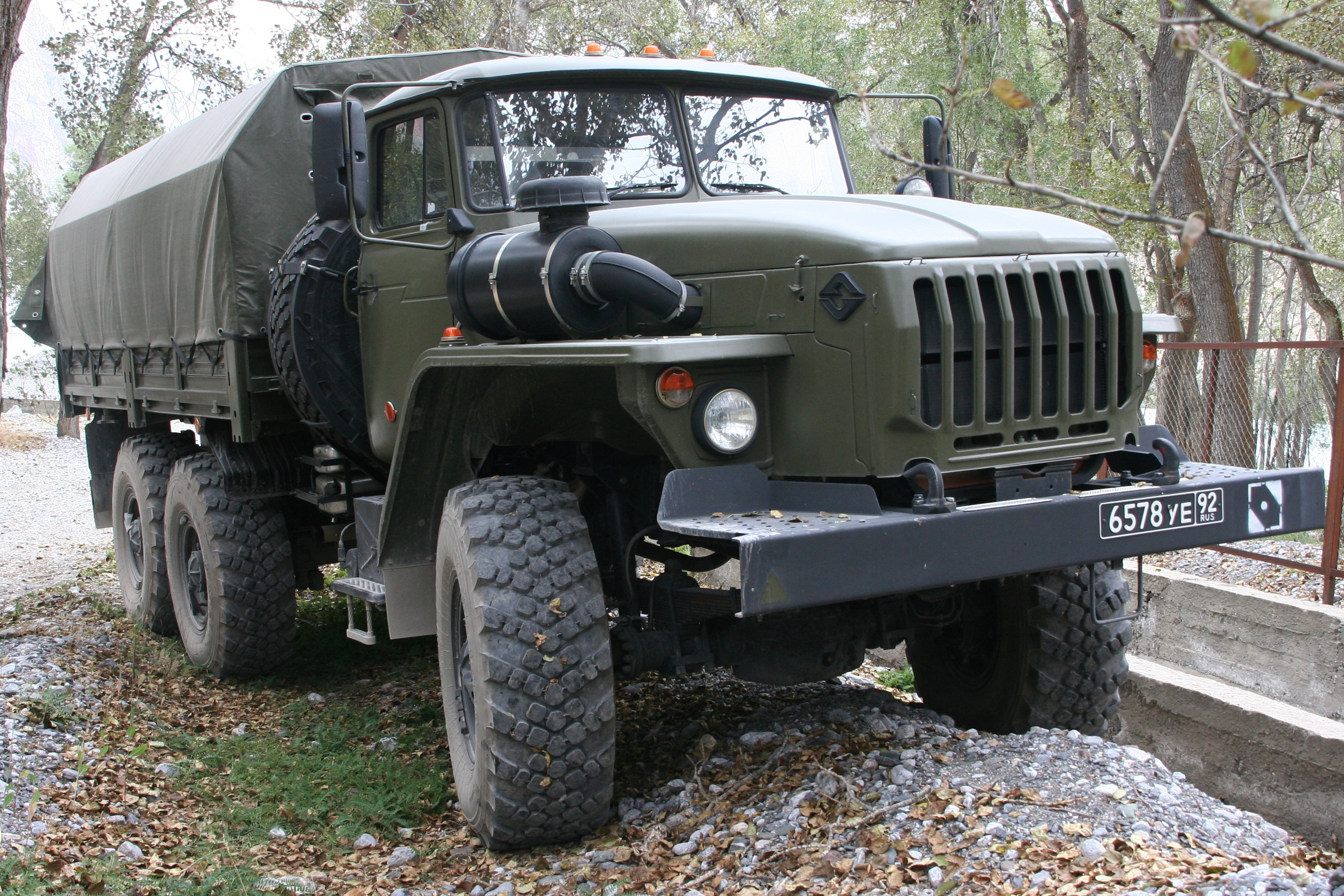
Ural-4320

The Ural-4320 is a general purpose off-road 6×6 vehicle, produced at the Ural Automotive Plant in Miass, Russia for use by the Russian Army. The wheel arrangement for the Ural-4320 was designed for transporting cargo, people and trailers on all types of roads and terrain. It also serves as a launching platform for the BM-21 "Grad" rocket launcher.

== See also ==
- List of the United States military vehicles by model number
- Transportation Corps
- Motor Transport Corps
- Combat Logistics Battalion 25
- Army engineering maintenance
