= Salyut Machine-Building Association =

Company based in Moscow, Russia

Coordinates: 55°46′21″N 37°43′27″E

- Company type: Joint-stock company
- Founded: 1912; 114 years ago
- Headquarters: Moscow, Russia
- Revenue: $796 million (2017)
- Operating income: $263 million (2017)
- Net income: $181 million (2017)
- Total assets: $1.35 billion (2017)
- Total equity: $759 million (2017)
- Number of employees: 23,000 (2017)
- Parent: United Engine Corporation
- Website: www.salut.ru

Salyut Machine-Building Production Association (Russian: Научно-производственный центр газотурбостроения «Салют») is a company based in Moscow, Russia. NPC Salyut have three plants and office with further plants outside Moscow city. It is a subsidiary of United Engine Corporation.

Salyut is a leading commercial and military aircraft engine production association. Aircraft engine repairs and diagnostic services are also provided. Under conversion programs, Salyut produces a variety of commercial machinery and small engines.

Salyut manufactured the AL-21F turbofan engine for the Su-24 Fencer and the AL-31F engine for the Su-27 Flanker.

== History ==
The factory was established in 1912 as a subsidiary of the French engine manufacturer Gnome et Rhône. In 1941 the factory was evacuated to Samara, eventually becoming JSC Kuznetsov. Engine production at the Moscow site was restored by July 1942. Since the 1980s, the main activity of the company is the production of turboshaft engines for various purposes.

== Subsidiaries ==
- Naro Fominsk Motor Plant
- Perm Motor Plant
- Ufa UMPO plants
- Omsk OMKB
- Tyumen Motor Plant
- MMP Chernyshev, TMKB Soyuz (Tushino)

MKB Sojuz (Turaevo), LMZ ODK

== Products ==
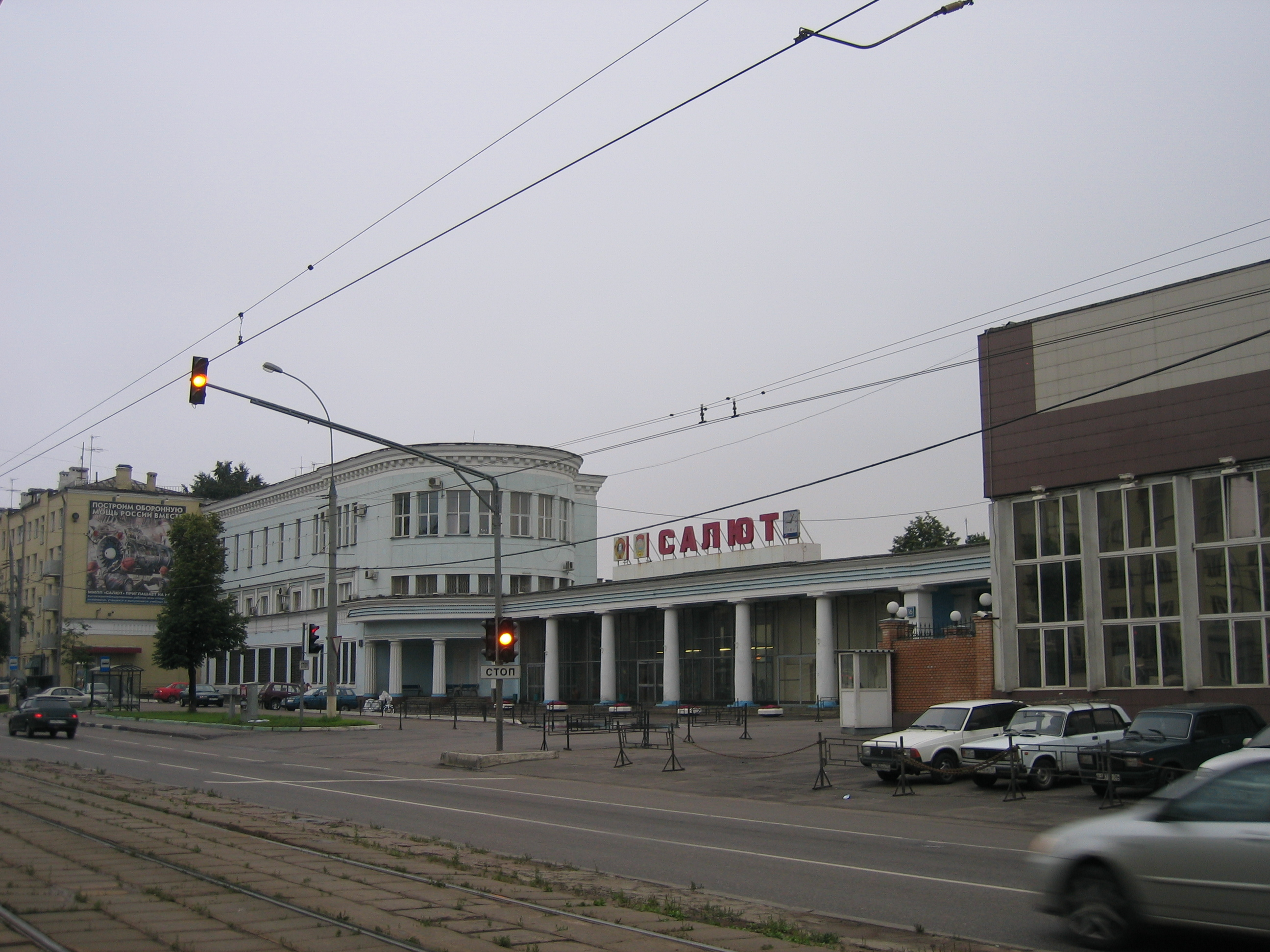
Main factory building in Moscow

- RD-33 versions
- TV1 TV3 TV7 VK Klimov engines
- AL-31 31F40 31FM1 31FM2, 41F1 41F117, AL-21 for Su-24
- AI-222 versions main AI222-25 for Yak-130, AI-22 AI-25 AI-28 Lotarev DV-2 RD-35 and others
- Progress D-27 Propfan along Aerosila
- Progress D-436 D-436T 148
- GTD-16S and GTU-20S Gas Turbine
- ST-100 (AI-222-25), SM-100
- Gas Turbines (various)
- GTD-20/12DTs 20 MW
- GTU-89ST-20 20 MW along MKB Granit
- Marine GTUs

AMNTK Sojuz

- R179V-300 AMNTK, R79V-300
- R-179TV1 medium heavy cargo aircraft D-18 engine class
- GTD30-300 30 MW naval R179V
- R-579-300 >110 >190 KN

=== Production history ===
- AL-31F Lyulka 1984 for Su-27
- AL-21F Lyulka 1972 on Su 17 20 22 and for Su-24
- R-15B-300 Tumansky for MiG-25 1962
- AL-7F1 Lyulka 1955
- 1950 turbojet VK-1 VK1A Klimov
- 1948 turbojet RD-45 and RD-45F
- 1947 turbojet TR-1 Lyulka
