= Tumansky R-15 =

Soviet turbojet aircraft engine

R-15
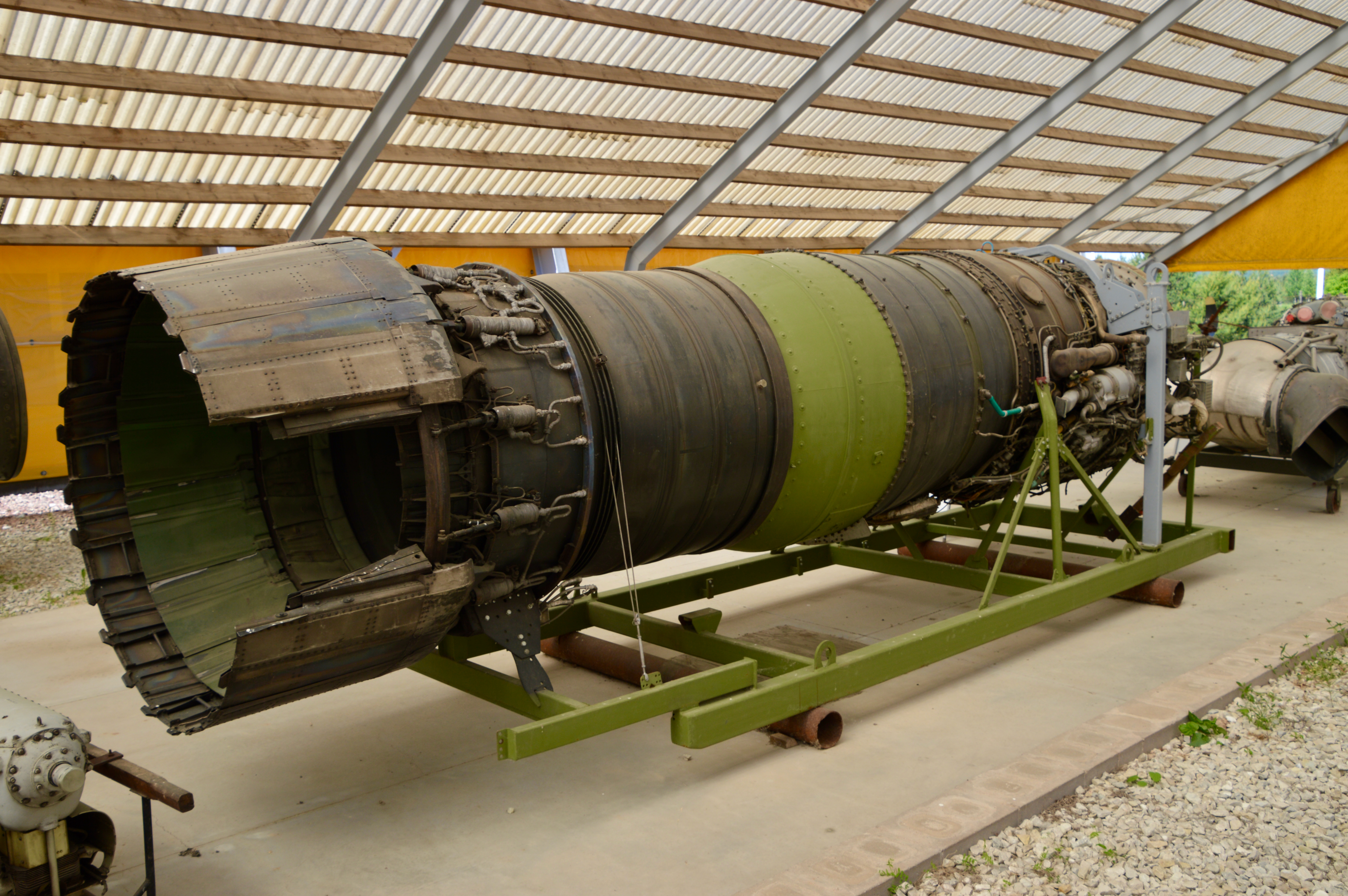
- Tumansky R-15BD-300 turbojet engine on display at the Estonian Aviation Museum
- Type: turbojet
- Manufacturer: Salyut Machine-Building Association
- Major applications: Mikoyan-Gurevich MiG-25; Tupolev Tu-123

The Tumansky R-15 is an axial-flow, single-shaft turbojet with an afterburner. Its best known use is on the Mikoyan-Gurevich MiG-25.

== Design and development ==
The R-15-300 was designed at the OKB-300 design bureau led by Sergei Tumansky in the late 1950s. The engine was originally intended for the Tupolev Tu-121 high-altitude high-speed cruise missile. Due to a lack of Soviet resources and funding, the engine casing was mainly steel, and in areas exposed to high temperatures, 30-micrometre silver-plated steel. At the time, the USSR did not have the resources to exploit metals such as titanium or other alloys that could have reduced the weight of the engine. The Tu-121 was later canceled, but its basic design was used in the Tupolev Tu-123 reconnaissance drone.

=== Performance ===
The maximum thrust was 7,500 kilograms force (73.5 kN, 16,500 lbf) dry and 11,200 kilograms force (110 kN, 24,700 lbf) with afterburner. This thrust enabled the Mikoyan-Gurevich MiG-25, with two engines, to reach Mach 3.1 at very high altitudes.

== Variants ==
- R-15-300: Original version. Used in Tupolev Tu-123 Yastreb drone.
- R-15-300M
- R-15B-300: Electronic engine controls (the first for a Soviet engine). and modifications to increase life span. Original engine for the MiG-25P, MiG-25R and variants.
- R-15BD-300: Improved and more powerful version for MiG-25PD and MiG-25PDS. Engine Lifespan increased up to 1000 Hours.
- R-15BF2-300: Uprated version. Used in Ye-266M high-performance MiG-25M prototype. MiG-25M aircraft was never put into production

== Applications ==
- Mikoyan-Gurevich MiG-25
- Mikoyan-Gurevich Ye-150 family
- Tupolev Tu-121
- Tupolev Tu-123

== Specifications (R-15B-300) ==
Data from

==== General characteristics ====
- Type: Afterburning turbojet
- Length: 6,264 mm (246.6 in)
- Diameter: 966 mm (38 in) inlet, 1,512 mm (59.5 in) overall
- Dry weight: 2,454 kg (5,410 lb)

==== Components ====
- Compressor: 5-stage axial compressor
- Turbine: single-stage turbine
- Fuel type: T-6 special kerosene
- Oil system: type 67 grade

==== Performance ====
- Maximum thrust:
- 73.5 kN (16,523 lbf) military power
- 100.1 kN (22,503 lbf) with afterburner
- Overall pressure ratio: 4.75:1
- Turbine inlet temperature: 942 °C (1,727 °F)
- Specific fuel consumption:
- 127 kg/[h·kN] (1.25 lb/[h·lbf]) at idle
- 275 kg/[h·kN] (2.70 lb/[h·lbf]) with afterburner
- Thrust-to-weight ratio: 3.05; 4.16 with afterburner.

== See also ==
- Soyuz Scientific Production Association
