= Tumansky R-29 =

Soviet turbojet

R-29
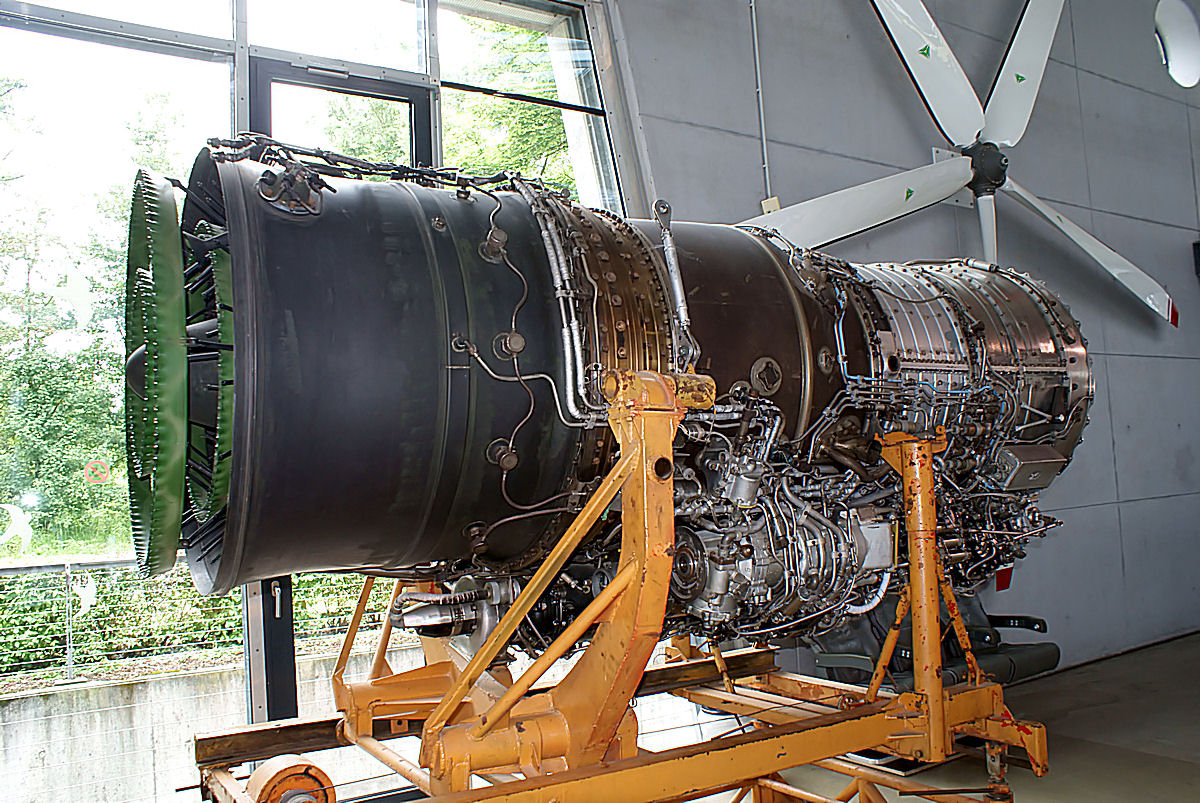
- Tumansky R-29-300 on display at the Deutsches Museum Flugwerft Schleissheim
- Type: Turbojet
- Manufacturer: Tumansky, UMPO, MMP Chernyshev, AMNTK Sojuz
- First run: 1972
- Major applications: MiG-23
- Developed from: Tumansky R-27
- Developed into: Tumansky R-35

The Tumansky R-29 is a Soviet turbojet aircraft engine that was developed in the early 1970s. It is generally described as being in the "third generation" of Soviet gas turbine engines which are characterized by high thrust-to-weight ratios and the use of turbine air cooling.

== Variants ==
R-29-300

Original variant. Used in the MiG-23MF and related variants.

R-29B-300

Simplified variant of the engine intended for the MiG-27.

R-29PN

Advanced variant that replaced the -300 model on non-export aircraft.

R-29BS-300

Variant with modified gearbox. Used in several export variants of the Sukhoi Su-17.

Khatchaturov R-35-300

Developed version used in late variants of the MiG-23.

Shenyang WP-15

Chinese reverse-engineered copy of the R-29-300.

== Applications ==
- IAR 95 (Intended application)
- Mikoyan-Gurevich MiG-23
- Mikoyan MiG-27
- Chengdu J-10 (Prototype)
- Shenyang J-13 (Intended application)
- Sukhoi Su-22

== Specifications (R-29-300) ==
Data from

==== General characteristics ====
- Type: Turbojet
- Length: 4,953 mm (195.0 in)
- Diameter: 912 mm (35.9 in)
- Dry weight: 1,880 kg (4,140 lb)

==== Components ====
- Compressor: Two-spool Five-stage low pressure, six-stage high pressure (axial)
- Combustors: Annular
- Turbine: Two-stage high pressure, single-stage low pressure

==== Performance ====
- Maximum thrust:
- 78.48 kilonewtons (17,640 lb_{f}) full military (dry)
- 112.81 kilonewtons (25,360 lb_{f}) with boosted afterburner (CSR mode, altitude < 4,000 metres (13,000 ft))
- Overall pressure ratio: 12.9:1
- Air mass flow: 105 kg/s
- Turbine inlet temperature: 1,083 °C
- Specific fuel consumption: =
  - 96,8 kg/(h·kN) (0.95 lb/(h·lbf)) at maximum military power
  - 202,76 kg/(h·kN) (2 lb/(h·lbf)) with afterburner
- Thrust-to-weight ratio: 4.446; 6.119 with afterburner.

== See also ==
- Soyuz Scientific Production Association

Comparable engines

- Lyulka AL-21

Related lists

- List of aircraft engines
