= Aleksey Tupolev =

Soviet aircraft designer (1925–2001)

- Алексей Туполев
- Born: 20 May 1925; Moscow, Russian SFSR, Soviet Union
- Died: 12 May 2001 (aged 75)
- Resting place: Moscow, Russia
- Education: Moscow Aviation Institute
- Father: Andrei Tupolev
- Engineering career
- Discipline: Aircraft design
- Institutions: Tupolev Design Bureau
- Projects: Buran space shuttle
- Significant design: Tupolev Tu-144

Signature
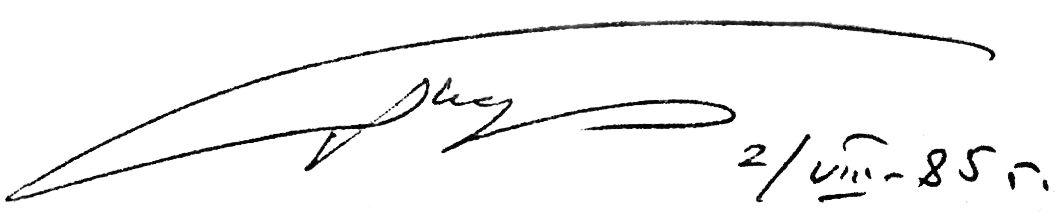

Aleksey Andreevich Tupolev (Russian: Алексе́й Андре́евич Ту́полев; 20 May 1925 – 12 May 2001) was a Soviet and Russian aircraft designer who led the development of the first supersonic passenger jet, the Tupolev Tu-144. He also helped design the Buran space shuttle and the long-range heavy bomber Tu-2000, both of which were suspended for lack of funding.

== Biography ==
Aleksey Andreevich Tupolev was born on 20 May 1925 in Moscow. He was the son of the famed Soviet aircraft pioneer Andrei Tupolev.

Aleksey worked at the Tupolev Design Bureau in 1942–1949 as a factory designer. He graduated from the Moscow Aviation Institute in 1949.

During Soviet leader Khrushchev's visit to the U.S. in September 1959, he insisted on taking Tu-114 despite that its maiden long-distance flight only occurred in May. In order to guarantee the safety, Aleksey Tupolev was sent by his father Andrei, along as a sign of his confidence in the plane. Khrushchev later said, "We didn't publicize the fact that Tupolev's son was with us" for "to do so would have meant giving explanations, and these might have been damaging to our image".

His son, Andrey Alekseevich Tupolev, was born in 1961.

Aleksey became chief designer of the Tupolev Design Bureau in 1963 and general designer in 1973.

Aleksey Tupolev died on 12 May 2001. He was buried in Moscow.

== Projects ==
- Tupolev Tu-134 is a twin-engined, jet airliner built in the Soviet Union for short and medium-haul routes from 1966 to 1989.
- Tupolev Tu-144 is a Soviet supersonic passenger airliner.
- Tupolev Tu-154 is a three-engined, medium-range, airliner designed in the mid-1960s.
- Tupolev Tu-160 is a supersonic heavy strategic bomber.
- Tupolev Tu-204 is a twin-engined medium-range narrow-body jet airliner.
- "Buran" was the first spaceplane to be produced as part of the Soviet/Russian Buran programme.
- Tupolev Tu-123 Yastreb was one of the earliest Soviet reconnaissance drones.
- Tupolev Tu-142 is a Soviet/Russian maritime reconnaissance and anti-submarine warfare (ASW) aircraft.
