= Soyuz Scientific Production Association =

- Type: Open Joint Stock Company
- Founded: 1943
- Headquarters: Moscow, Russia
- Website: www.amntksoyuz.ru

Soyuz Scientific Production Association (Russian: Московское научно-производственное предприятие (МНПК) "Союз") is a company based in Moscow, Russia.

The Moscow Soyuz Scientific Production Complex was founded by Alexander Mikulin as an experimental design bureau in 1943. Mikulin's wartime engine designs powered MiG-3 interceptors and Il-2 Shturmovik attack aircraft. Sergei Tumansky succeeded Mikulin as general director of the design bureau in 1956.

As the Tumanskiy OKB, the bureau produced designs for the RD-9 (used in the MiG-19 Farmer), the RD-11/RD-13/RD-25 (used in the many variants of the MiG-21 Fishbed), the R-195 (used in the Su-25 Frogfoot), the R-15 (used in the MiG-25 Foxbat), the RU-19 auxiliary power unit, the R-27/R-29 (used in the MiG-23/27 Flogger), and the R-79 (intended as the main thrust engine in the Yak-141 Freestyle). The engines designed by MNPK Soyuz are built by the Ufa Motor-Building Corporation and other plants.

03/25/2022

The Administration of the Republic of Tatarstan held a meeting on the issue of resuming the Tu-324 aircraft construction program. Within the framework of this meeting, the possibility of using the R126M-300 engine as an engine for the Tu-324 aircraft was discussed.

This engine will allow the Tu-324 aircraft to be especially competitive and allow for long-range flights.

The R126M-300 engine was created on the basis of the R126-300 engine. The base engine has a complete set of design documentation, as well as the conclusions of TsIAM them. P.I.Baranova and FSUE GosNII GA.

Specialists of JSC "AMNTK" Soyuz "applied to the Ministry of Transport with a proposal to use the R126M-300 engine for the Tu-324 aircraft.

03/28/2022

Deputy Prime Minister of Russia Yury Borisov together with the President of Tatarstan Rustam Minnikhanov visited the Kazan Aviation Plant. S.P. Gorbunova - a branch of Tupolev PJSC and got acquainted with the work of the enterprise. Also present were General Director of PJSC "UAC" Yuri Slyusar, Managing Director of PJSC "Tupolev" Vadima Koroleva, Director of KAZ them. S.P. Gorbunov - a branch of Tupolev PJSC Nikolai Savitsky.

During the visit to the plant, issues of increasing the production of Tu-214 passenger aircraft were considered. In the future, KAZ will be able to produce at least 10 Tu-214 aircraft per year.

According to Yuri Borisov, the possibility of using Tu-214 aircraft by domestic airlines Aeroflot, Red Wings and others is now being considered. It is planned to replace foreign components in Tu-214 within a year.

Specialists of OAO AMNTK Soyuz have developed an engine with a thrust of 20 tons, which will allow the Tu-214 aircraft to be especially competitive and allow flights ranging from 1,000 km to 13,000 km.

Engines of 20 tons were created on the basis of the R579-300 engine. The basic gas generator of the engine has more than 3,500 hours of gas operation, of which 500 are flight hours and has specific characteristics that are significantly higher than the engines known to us.

Engines of 20 tons have a specific fuel consumption of 0.398 kg / kgf h, with a bypass ratio of 5.62 and a gas temperature at the turbine inlet of 1630 K. Specialists of OAO AMNTK Soyuz applied to the Ministry of Transport with a proposal to use a 20-ton engine for the Tu-214 aircraft.

R579-300 Gasturbine engine

According to the manufacturer, this aircraft engine can be safely attributed to the fifth generation of aircraft engines, and high performance is achieved through the use of effective design solutions, and not through the use of complex technological operations and materials, the development of which by our industry can cause delays in development and mass production. promising turbojet engines.

The developer's website contains a table with the characteristics of the R579-300 turbojet engine in various versions, including options for VTOL aircraft with a maximum afterburner thrust of up to 21-23 thousand kgf.

Implementation options for the R579-300 turbojet engine for various aircraft. The R579-300 turbojet engine has two features that make it an extremely promising solution for a promising Russian VTOL aircraft. It's the possibility of connecting a load with a power of more than 40 MW on the shaft, and also has a gas-dynamic stability margin of more than 34% and at mastered temperatures, existing materials in OJSC "AMNTK" Soyuz ". An engine compressor with a unique high efficiency makes it possible to create on its basis different types of engines operating in a wide range of modes, up to connecting fans to the engine with a high bypass ratio, with a thrust of more than 45 tons. Also, an engine with high-speed modes for hypersonic aircraft operating in adaptive and combined modes.
