= Tupolev Tu-123 =

Reconnaissance drone in the USSR

Tupolev Tu-123 Yastreb
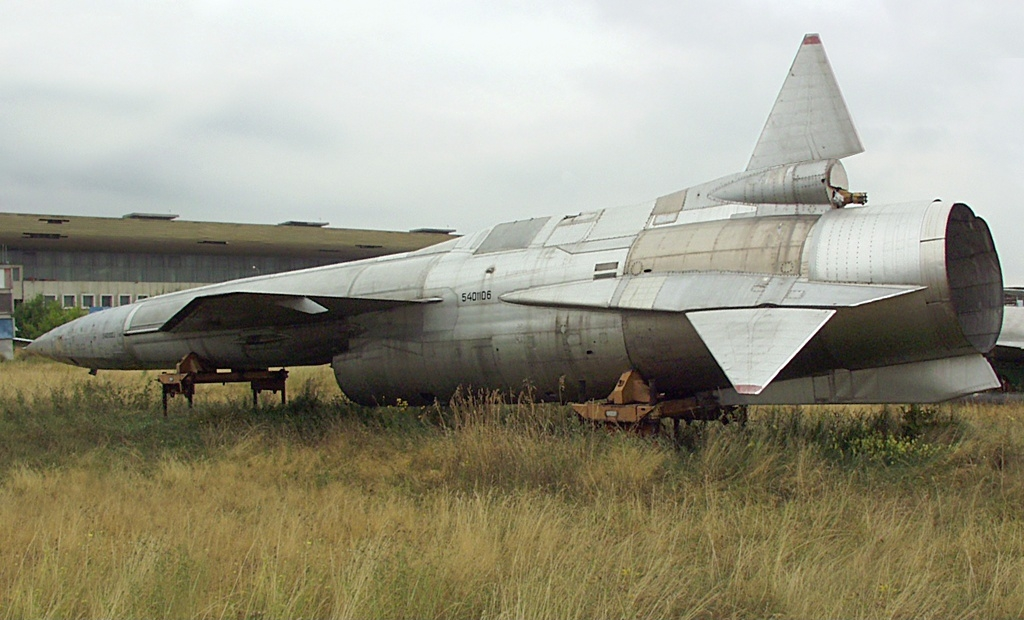
- Tu-123 at Khodynka Field, Moscow

General information
- Type: Reconnaissance Drone
- National origin: Soviet Union
- Manufacturer: Tupolev
- Status: out of service, retired
- Primary user: Soviet Union
- Number built: 52

History
- Manufactured: 1964–1972
- Introduction date: 1964
- First flight: 1960
- Retired: 1979

The Tupolev Tu-123 Yastreb (Hawk, Russian: Ястреб) was one of the earliest Soviet reconnaissance drones that began development in 1960. Sometimes referred to as the "DBR-1", it was introduced into active service in 1964.

== Design ==
The Tu-123 was a long-range, high-altitude supersonic strategic unmanned reconnaissance aircraft, in a form reminiscent of a big dart, conceptually somewhat similar to the United States' D-21. It carried both film cameras and SIGINT payloads.

The Tu-123 was ground-launched with JATO boosting and powered by a KR-15 afterburning turbojet in flight. The KR-15 was a lower-cost, short-life, expendable version of the R-15 engine used on the twin-engine, Mach 3-class Mikoyan-Gurevich MiG-25 Foxbat interceptor. The Tu-123 itself was expendable, parachuting its payload to the ground for recovery.

== History ==
=== Development ===
The Tu-123 was a development of the proposed Tupolev Tu-121 supersonic nuclear-armed cruise missile program. After the cancellation of that project in favor of ballistic missiles, the design was modified for a high-altitude reconnaissance role. The project was officially launched on 16 August 1960, under the designation “DBR-1”. The Tupolev Design Bureau designation was “I123K”, later changed to “Tu-123”.

Factory testing was completed in September 1961 and flight tests by December 1963. The new UAV entered active service on 23 May 1964. Mass production was at Voronezh Factory Number 64. From 1964 to 1972, 52 units were manufactured.

=== Operational history ===
The Tu-123 served with Soviet Air Force intelligence units stationed in the western border military districts until 1979. It theoretically had the range to cover all of Central and Western Europe, and performed well in training exercises. However, the expense of operating an expendable system was unsatisfactory. This led to the development of the Tu-139 Yastreb 2, a reusable version which could land on unprepared airstrips. It was never put into production.

The Tu-123 was gradually removed from service, and replaced by the MiG-25R, a reconnaissance version of the Foxbat.

== Specifications ==
General characteristics

- Crew: none
- Length: 27.84 m (91 ft 4 in)
- Wingspan: 8.41 m (27 ft 7 in)
- Height: 4.78 m (15 ft 8 in)
- Empty weight: 11,450 kg (25,250 lb)
- Gross weight: 35,610 kg (78,520 lb)
- Powerplant: 1 × Tumansky KR-15 , 98.1 kN (22,046 lbf) thrust

Performance

- Maximum speed: 2,700 km/h (1,675 mph, 1,456 kn)
- Range: 3,200 km (2,000 mi, 1,700 nmi)
- Service ceiling: 22,800 m (74,800 ft)
