= Tupolev Tu-121 =

1959 Soviet unmanned aircraft prototype

General information
- Type: Unmanned aerial vehicle
- National origin: USSR
- Manufacturer: Tupolev
- Designer: Alexey Tupolev
- Status: Prototype
- Number built: 1 prototype

History
- First flight: 1959

The Tupolev Tu-121 was an unmanned aircraft, intended for use as a cruise missile, designed by Tupolev in the Soviet Union during the Cold War.

== Development ==
In 1957, the Tupolev Design Bureau was in very good standing. Their Tu-95 was being actively introduced to the Air Force, their Tu-16 was being produced in three plants. Tupolev, however, was worried about Nikita Khrushchev's growing interest in rocket weapons. The USSR had made significant progress in rocket science and was preparing to launch their first rocket – the R-7. Rockets seemed invincible for existing and future anti-aircraft systems. Soviet bombers were not so lucky, being extremely vulnerable. The NORAD system, which was being developed and deployed by the United States at the time was practically impermeable for the strategic bombers of that era.

Various attempts to arm Tu-95s with missiles had a serious drawback – the bomber itself remained vulnerable to interceptors and ground-to-air missiles.

Tu-121 was conceived as an aircraft able to reach speeds of over 2,000 km/h and a flight altitude of 50 km which would allow it to easily penetrate both American air- and missile defence systems.

However, even at the early stages, Tupolev himself realized that his bureau was unable to develop such an aircraft. The biggest problem was immense heat. The materials necessary to build the heat-shield were developed only in the 1980s for the Buran programme.

The aircraft was built and several test launches were performed. However, it did not go beyond the prototype phase. The R-12 rocket, developed by Mikhail Yangel had better range and accuracy. On 5 February 1960, the project was officially cancelled.

The aircraft was a full-metal monoplane made almost entirely of traditional materials. The wing had no high-lift devices. The aircraft was piloted using vertical and horizontal stabilizers. Most of the fuselage consisted of fuel tanks.

== Specifications ==
Data from http://www.airwar.ru/enc/bpla/tu121.html

General characteristics

- Crew: unmanned
- Length: 24.77 m (81 ft 3 in)
- Wingspan: 8.40 m (27 ft 7 in)
- Empty weight: 11,450 kg (25,243 lb)
- Max takeoff weight: 35,000 kg (77,162 lb)
- Fuel capacity: 16,600 kg

Performance

- Maximum speed: 2,775 km/h (1,724 mph, 1,498 kn)

== See also ==
Aircraft of comparable role, configuration, and era

- AGM-28 Hound Dog
