= Truck =

Commercial or utilitarian motor vehicle

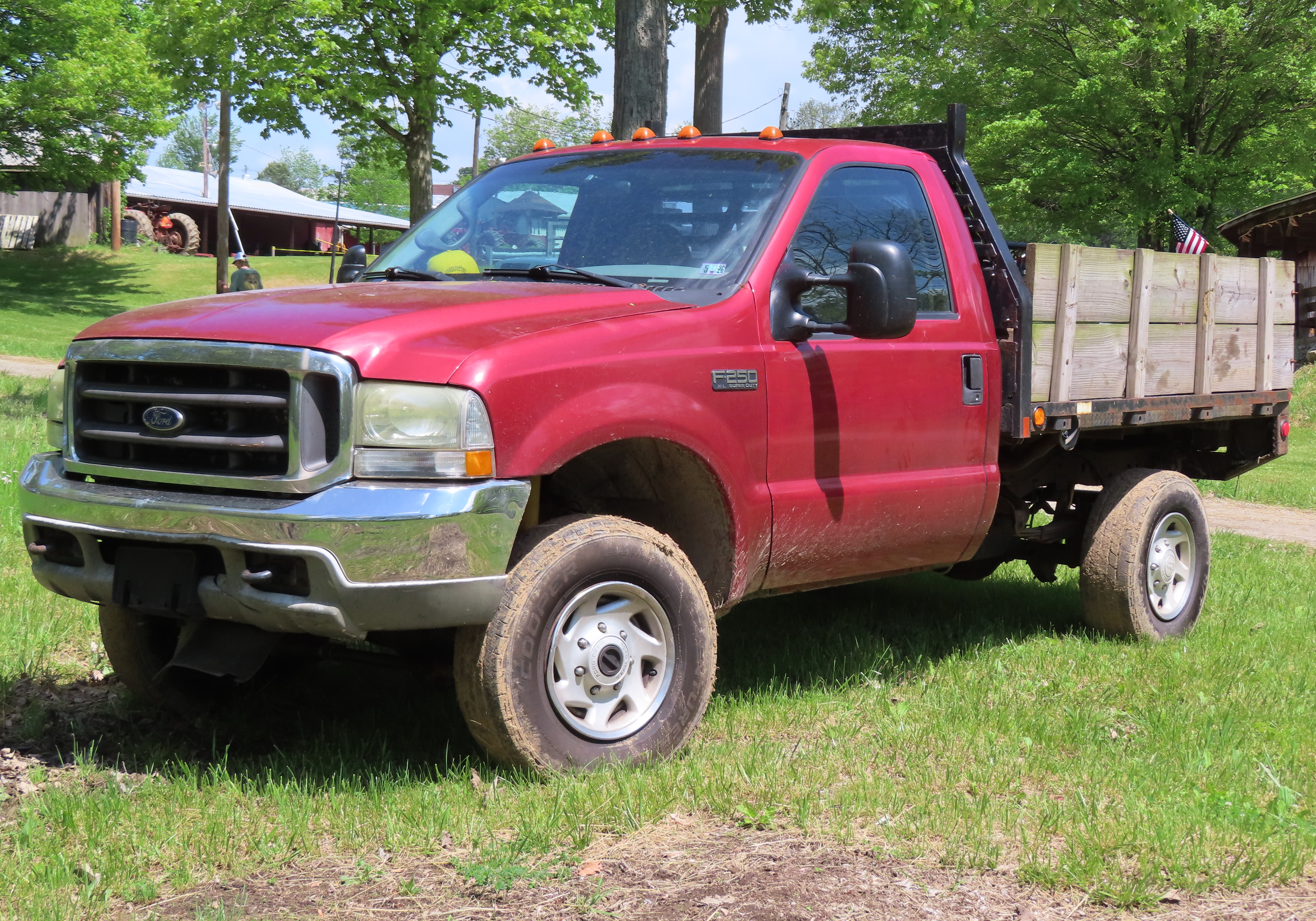
- Ford F-Series is one of the best-selling truck lineups ever produced.
- Classification: Vehicle
- Application: Commerce, Construction, Emergency, Logistics, Military, Industry and other transportation
- Fuel source: Battery, Biodiesel, Diesel (most common), Hybrid, Hydrogen, Gasoline, Natural gas
- Powered: Yes
- Self-propelled: Yes
- Wheels: 3–16 (18 or more with trailers)
- Axles: 2-6
- Inventor: Gottlieb Daimler, Wilhelm Maybach
- Invented: 1896 (130 years ago)

A truck (North American and Australian English) or lorry (British English) is a motor vehicle designed to transport freight, carry specialized payloads, or perform other utilitarian work. Trucks vary greatly in size, power, and configuration, but the vast majority feature body-on-frame construction, with a cabin that is independent of the payload portion of the vehicle. Smaller varieties may be mechanically similar to some automobiles. Commercial trucks can be very large and powerful and may be configured to be mounted with specialized equipment, such as in the case of refuse trucks, fire trucks, concrete mixers, and suction excavators. In American English, a commercial vehicle without a trailer or other articulation is formally a "straight truck" while one designed specifically to pull a trailer is not a truck but a "tractor".

The majority of trucks currently in use are powered by diesel engines, although small- to medium-size trucks with gasoline engines exist in North America. Electrically powered trucks are more popular in China and Europe than elsewhere. In the European Union, vehicles with a gross combination mass of up to 3.5 t (3.4 long tons; 3.9 short tons) are defined as light commercial vehicles, and those over as large goods vehicles.

== History ==
=== Steam wagons ===
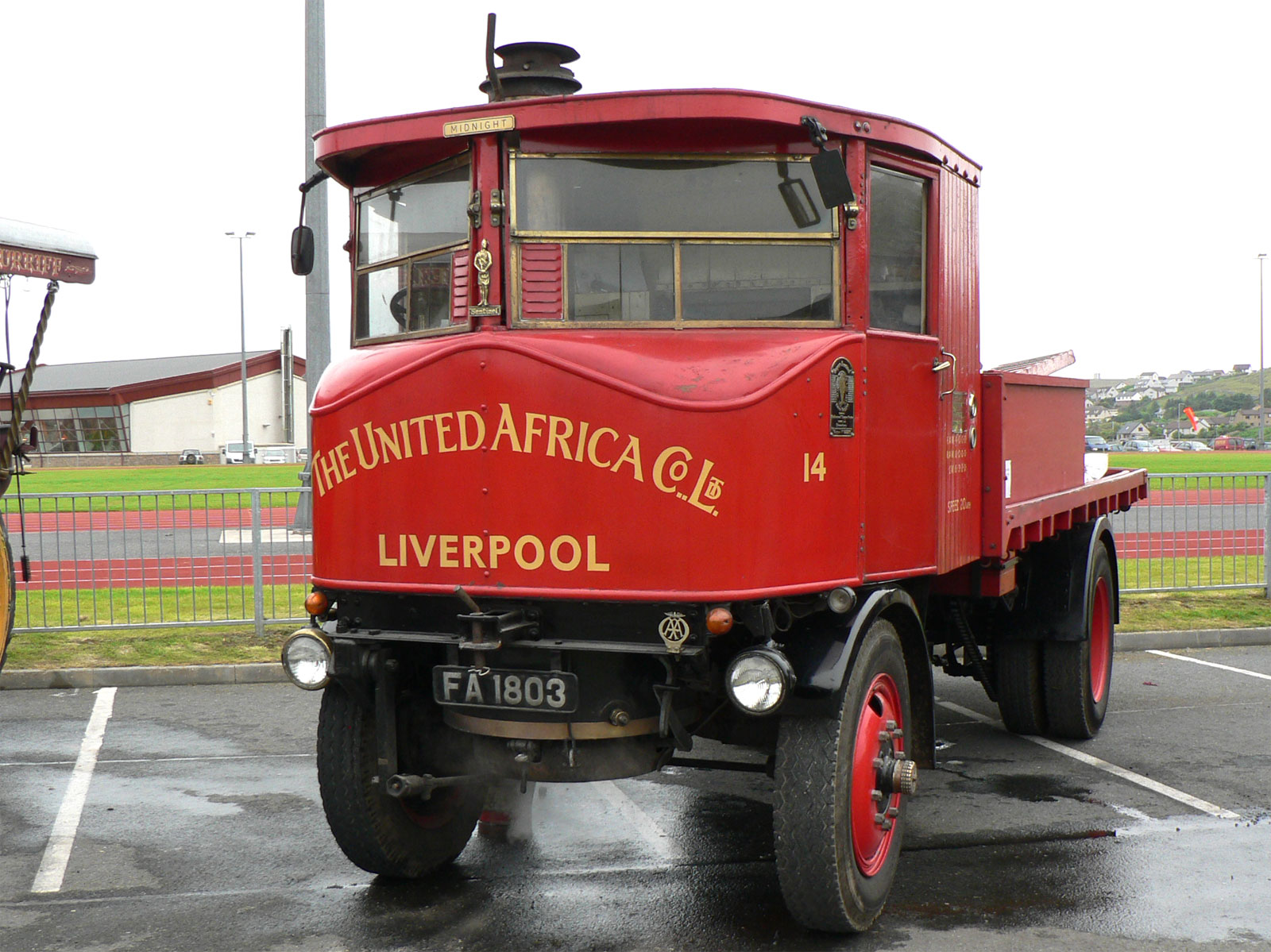
Sentinel steam wagon

Steam wagons were not common until the mid-19th century. The roads of the time, built for horse and carriages, limited these vehicles to very short hauls, usually from a factory to the nearest railway station. The first semi-trailer appeared in 1881, towed by a steam tractor manufactured by De Dion-Bouton. Steam-powered wagons were sold in France and the United States until the eve of World War I, and 1935 in the United Kingdom, when a change in road tax rules made them uneconomic against the new diesel lorries.

=== Internal combustion ===
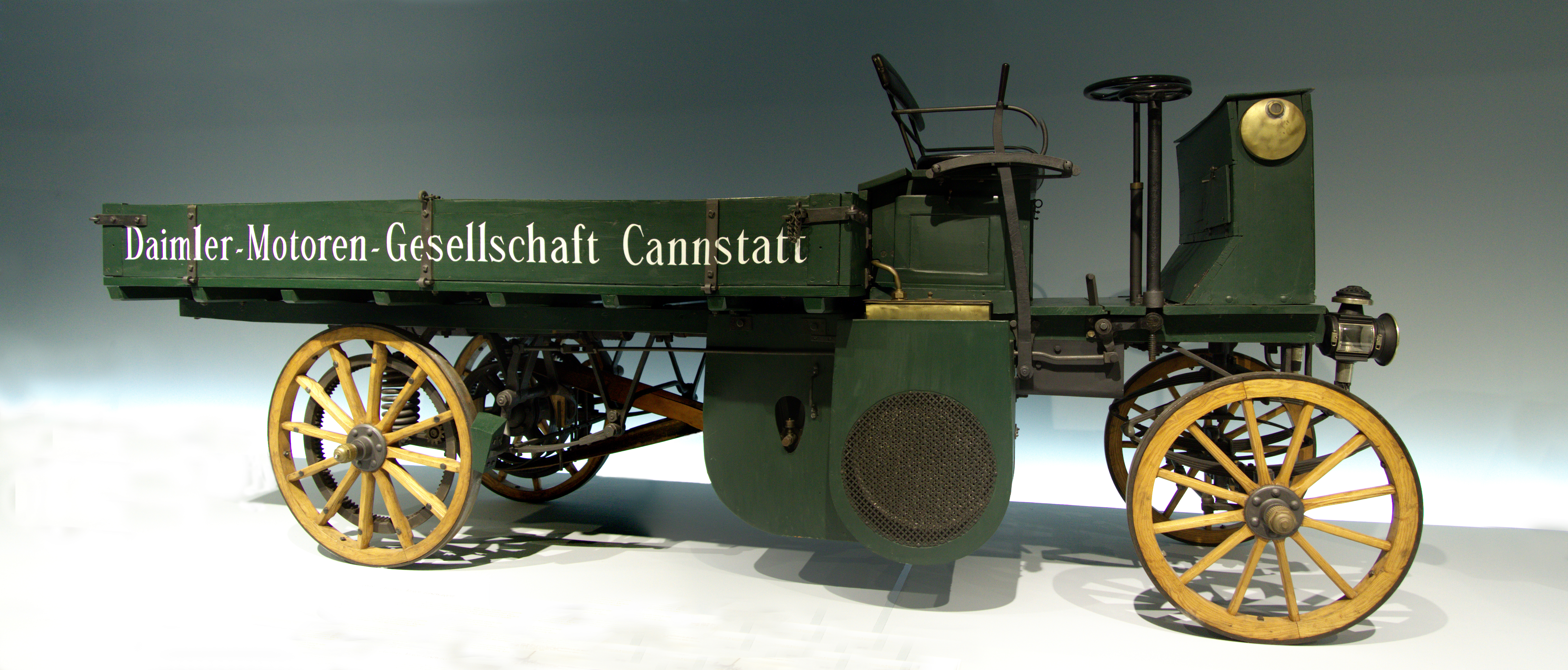
Daimler Motor-Lastwagen from 1898

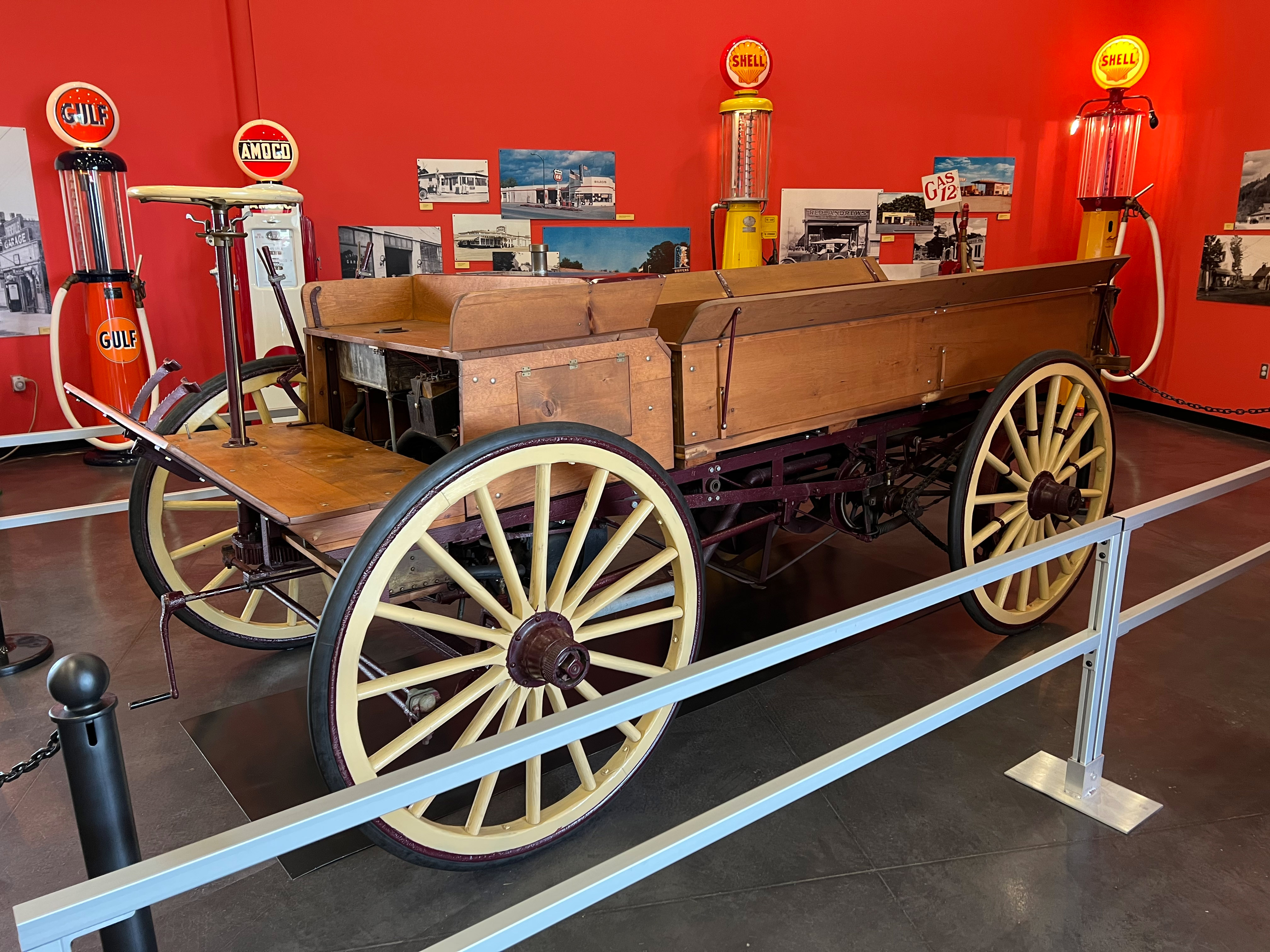
1903 Eldridge truck on display at the Iowa 80 Trucking Museum, Walcott, Iowa.

In 1895, Karl Benz designed and built the first internal combustion truck. Later that year some of Benz's trucks were modified to become busses by Netphener. A year later, in 1896, another internal combustion engine truck was built by Gottlieb Daimler, the Daimler Motor Lastwagen. Other companies, such as Peugeot, Renault and Büssing, also built their own versions. The first truck in the United States was built by Autocar in 1899, and was available with 5 or 8 horsepower (4 or 6 kW) engines. Another early American truck was built by George Eldridge of Des Moines, Iowa, in 1903. It was powered by an engine with two opposed cylinders, and had a chain drive A 1903 Eldridge truck is displayed at the Iowa 80 Trucking Museum, Walcott, Iowa. Trucks of the era mostly used two-cylinder engines and had a carrying capacity of 1.5 to 2 t (3,300 to 4,400 lb). After World War I, several advances were made: electric starters, and 4, 6, and 8 cylinder engines.

=== Diesel engines ===
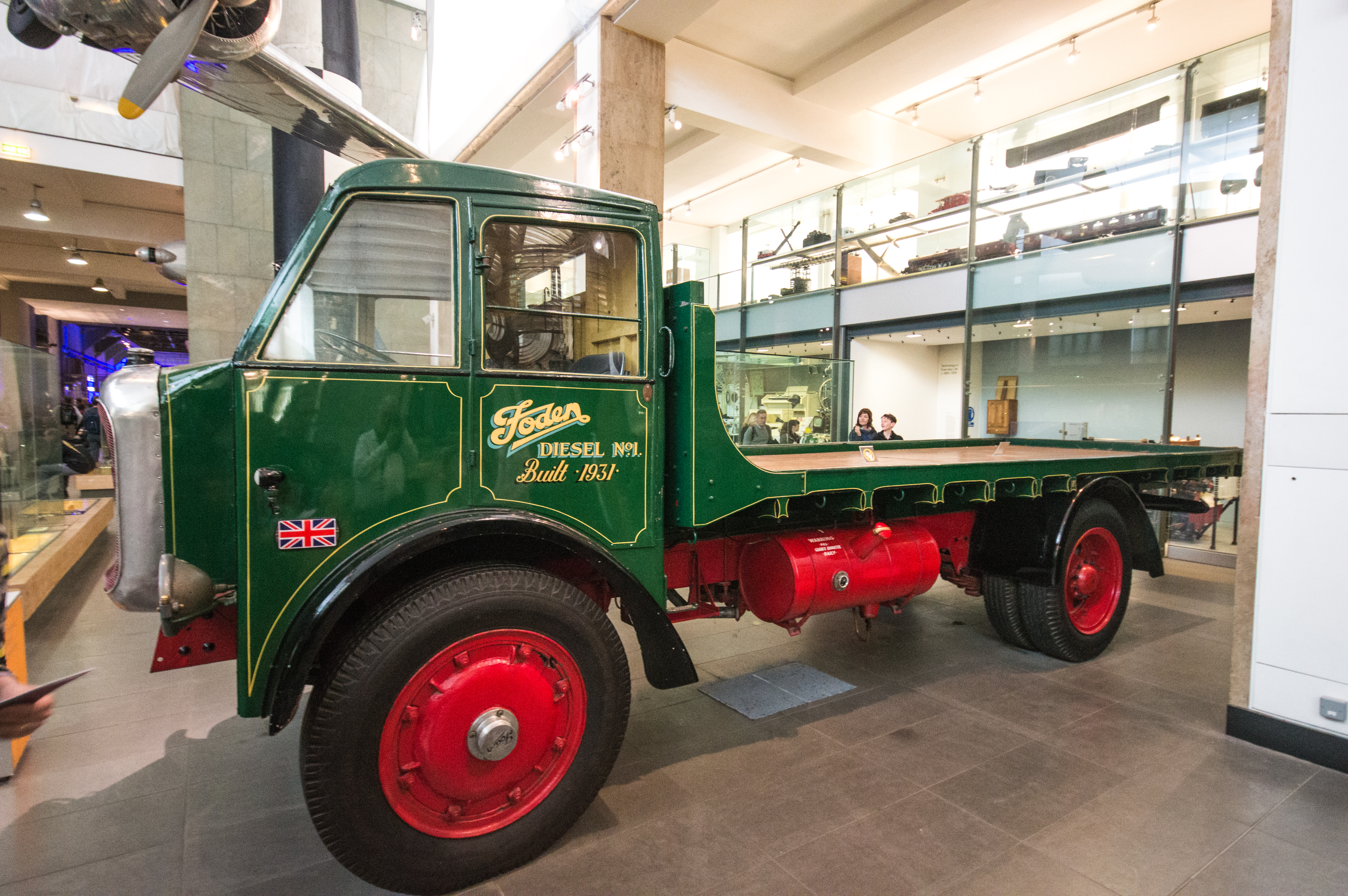
Foden diesel truck from 1931

Although it had been invented in 1897, the diesel engine did not appear in production trucks until Benz introduced it in 1923. The diesel engine was not common in trucks in Europe until the 1930s. In the United States, Autocar introduced diesel engines for heavy applications in the mid-1930s. Demand was high enough that Autocar launched the "DC" model (diesel conventional) in 1939. However, it took much longer for diesel engines to be broadly accepted in the US: gasoline engines were still in use on heavy trucks in the 1970s.

=== Electric motors ===
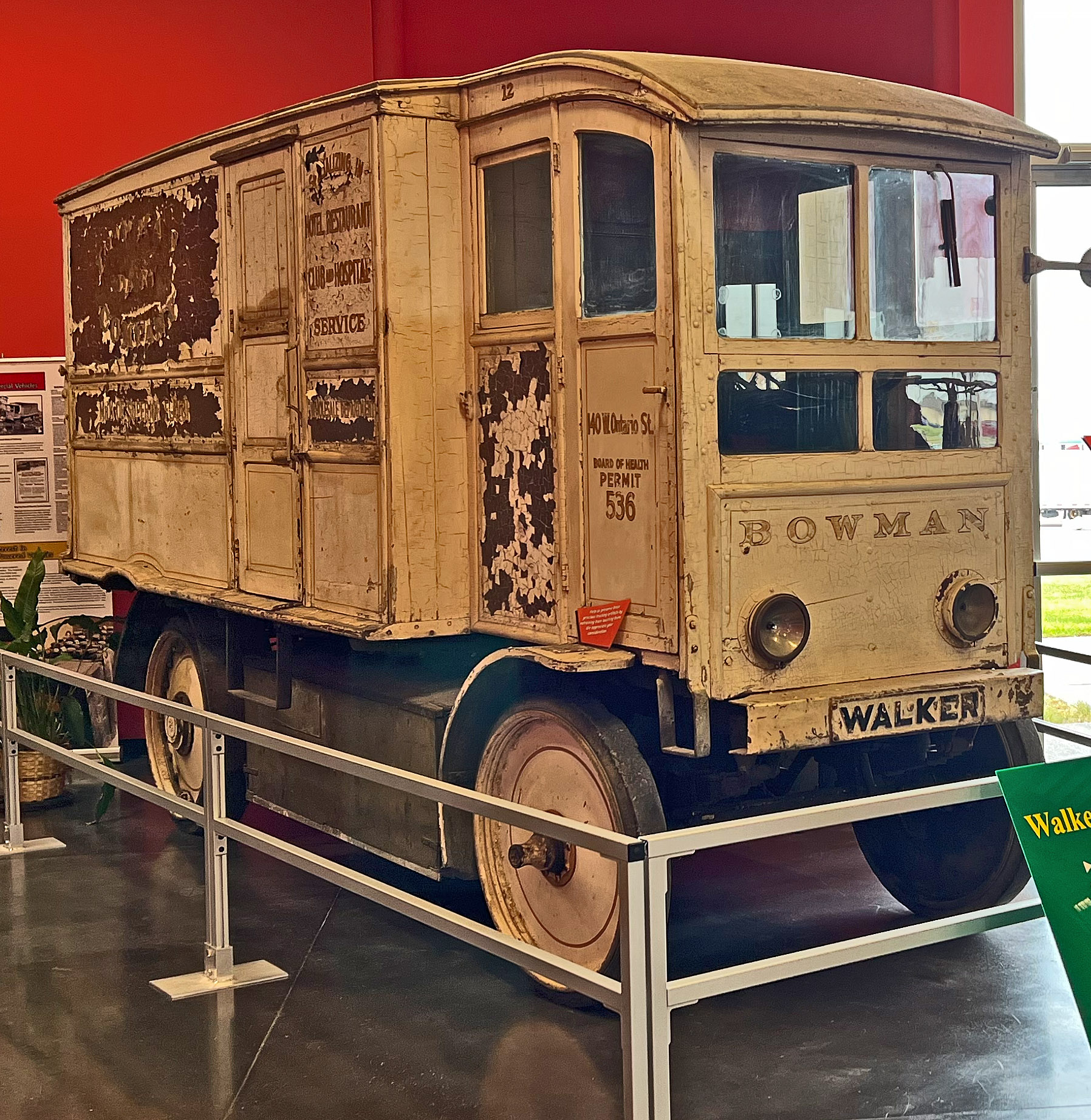
1911 Walker Electric truck on display at the Iowa 80 Trucking Museum, Walcott, Iowa.

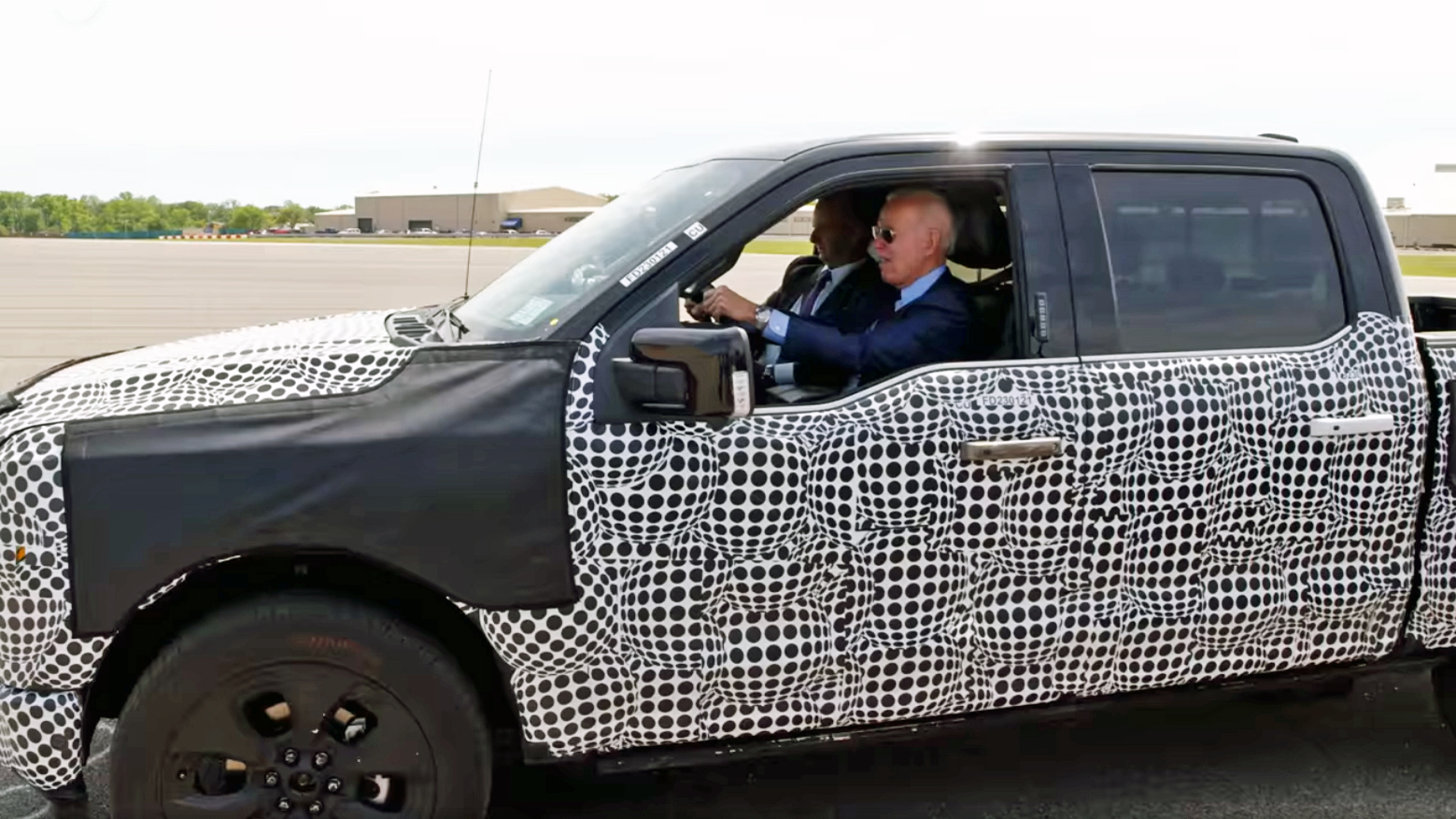
President Joe Biden test driving the Ford F-150 Lightning all-electric pick up at Ford's Rouge Electric Vehicle Center

Electrically powered trucks predate internal combustion ones and have been continuously available since the mid-19th-century. In the 1920s Autocar Trucks was the first of the major truck manufacturers to offer a range of electric trucks for sale. Electric trucks were successful for urban delivery roles and as specialized work vehicles like forklifts and pushback tugs. The higher energy density of liquid fuels soon led to the decline of electric-powered trucks in favor of, first, gasoline, and then diesel and CNG-fueled engines until battery technology advanced in the 2000s when new chemistries and higher-volume production broadened the range of applicability of electric propulsion to trucks in many more roles. Today, manufacturers are electrifying all trucks ahead of national regulatory requirements, with long-range over-the-road trucks being the most challenging.

=== Etymology ===
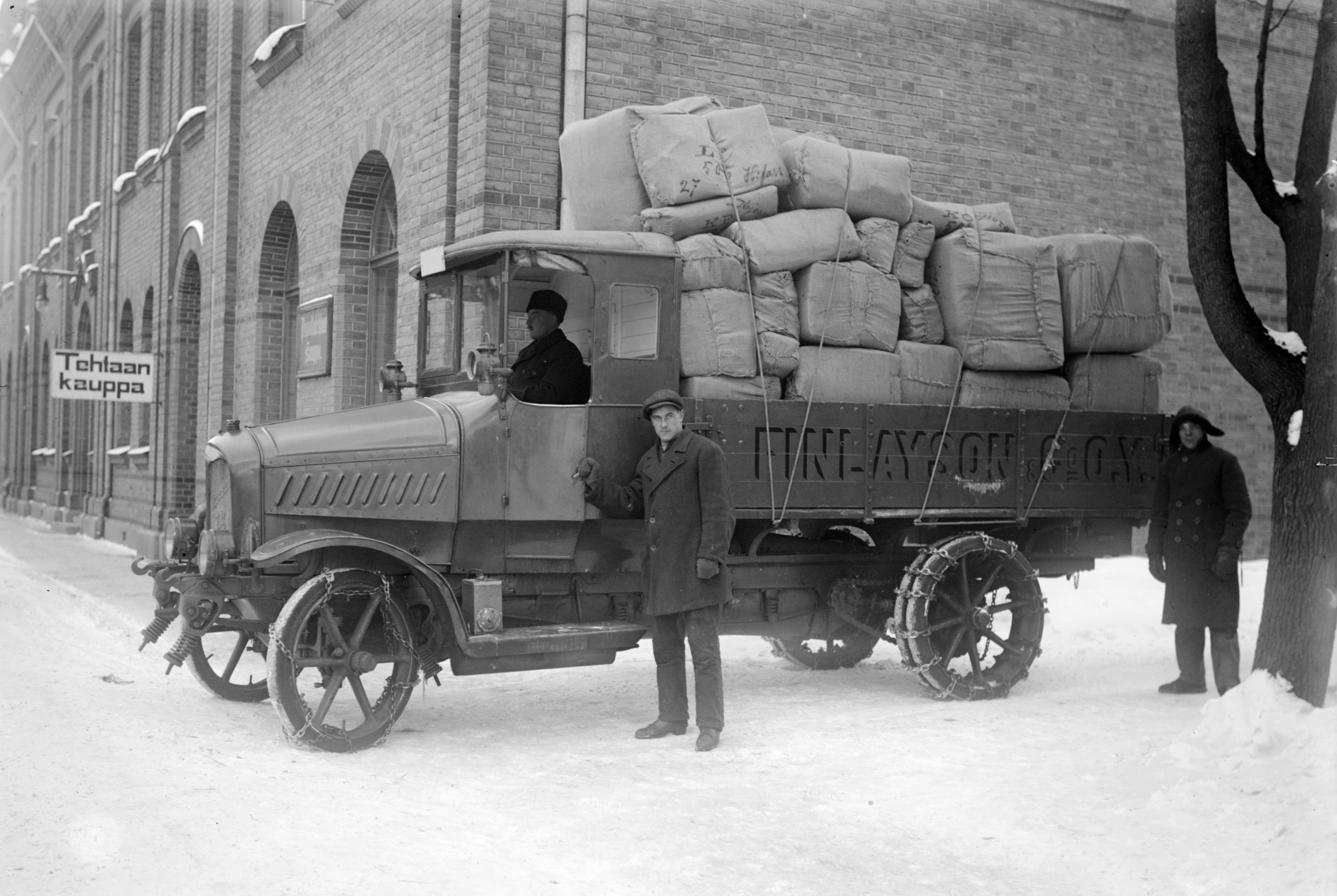
Mannesmann Mulag truck at the Finlayson factory in Tampere, Finland in 1921

Truck is used in American English; the British English equivalent is lorry.

The first known usage of "truck" was in 1611 when it referred to the small strong wheels on ships' cannon carriages, and comes from Greek τροχός (trokhos) = "wheel". In its extended usage, it came to refer to carts for carrying heavy loads, a meaning known since 1771. Its expanded application to "motor-powered load carrier" has been in usage since 1930, shortened from "motor truck", which dates back to 1901.

"Lorry" has a more uncertain origin, but probably has its roots in the rail transport industry, where the word is known to have been used in 1838 to refer to a type of truck (a goods wagon as in British usage, not a bogie as in the American), specifically a large flat wagon. It might derive from the verb lurry (to carry or drag along, or to lug) which was in use as early as 1664, but that association is not definitive. The expanded meaning of lorry, "self-propelled vehicle for carrying goods", has been in usage since 1911.

=== International variance ===
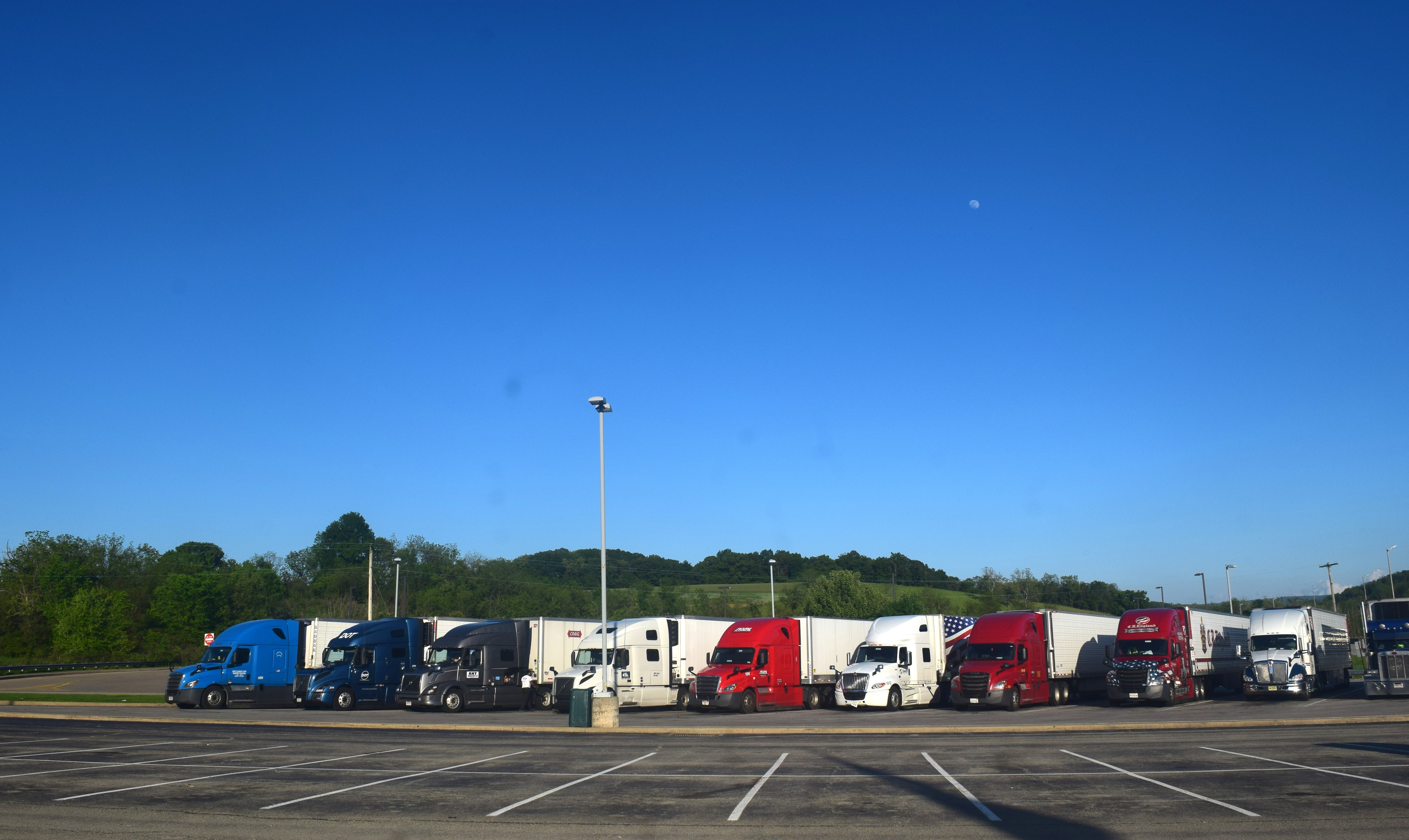
Trucks parked near Plaza, by the side of Highway in USA

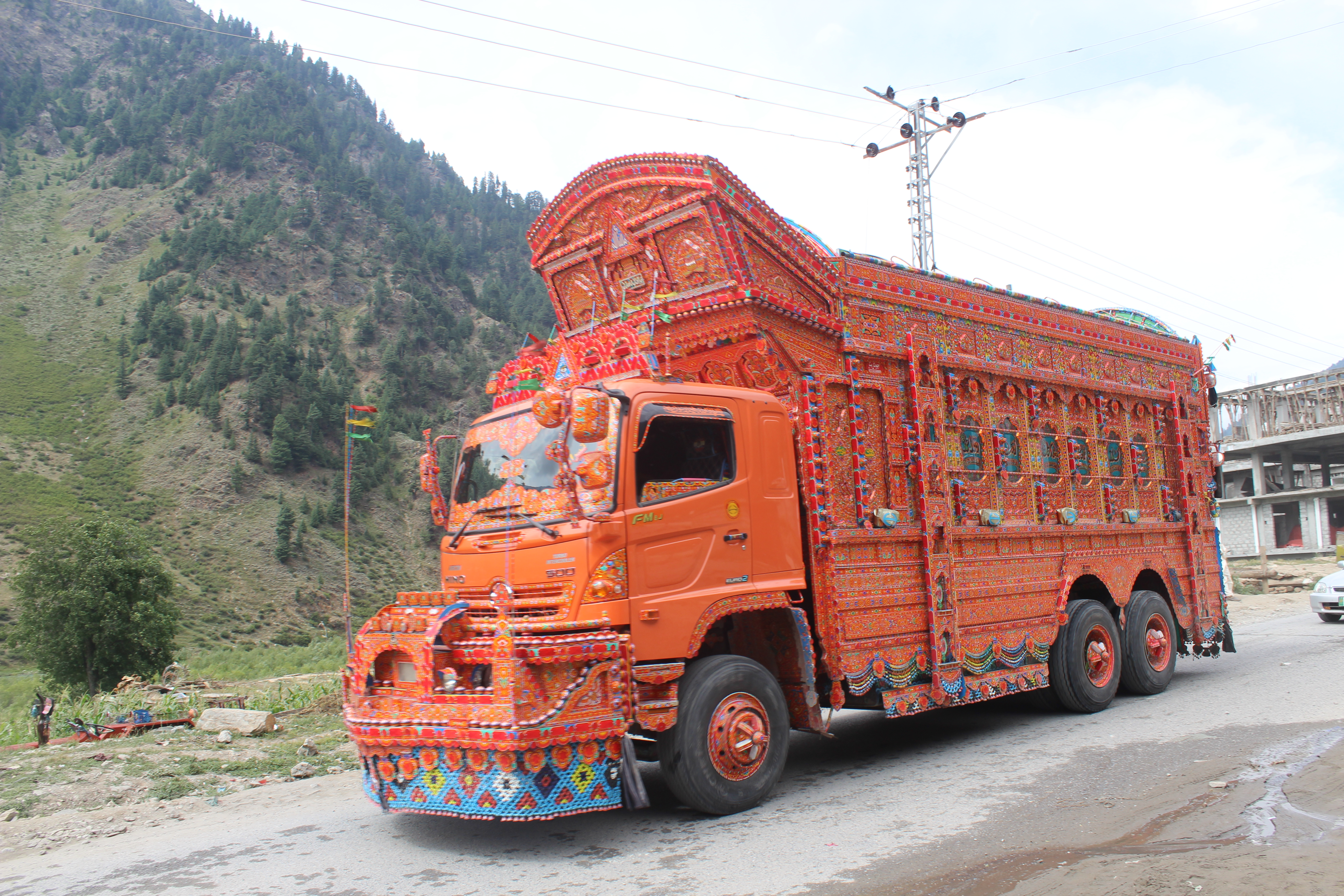
In Pakistan and India the majority of trucks are colorful and decorated.

In the United States, Canada, and the Philippines, "truck" is usually reserved for commercial vehicles larger than regular passenger cars, but includes large SUVs, pickups, and other vehicles with an open load bed.

In Australia, New Zealand and South Africa, the word "truck" is mostly reserved for larger vehicles. In Australia and New Zealand, a pickup truck is frequently called a ute (short for "utility" vehicle), while in South Africa it is called a bakkie (Afrikaans: "small open container").

In the United Kingdom, India, Malaysia, Singapore, Ireland, and Hong Kong lorry is used instead of truck, but only for the medium and heavy types, while truck is used almost exclusively to refer to pickups.

== Types by size ==
=== Ultra light ===
Often produced as variations of golf cars, with internal combustion or battery electric drive, these are used typically for off-highway use on estates, golf courses, and parks. While not suitable for highway use some variations may be licensed as slow speed vehicles for operation on streets, generally as a body variation of a neighborhood electric vehicle. A few manufactures produce specialized chassis for this type of vehicle, while Zap Motors markets a version of their Xebra electric tricycle (licensable in the U.S. as a motorcycle).

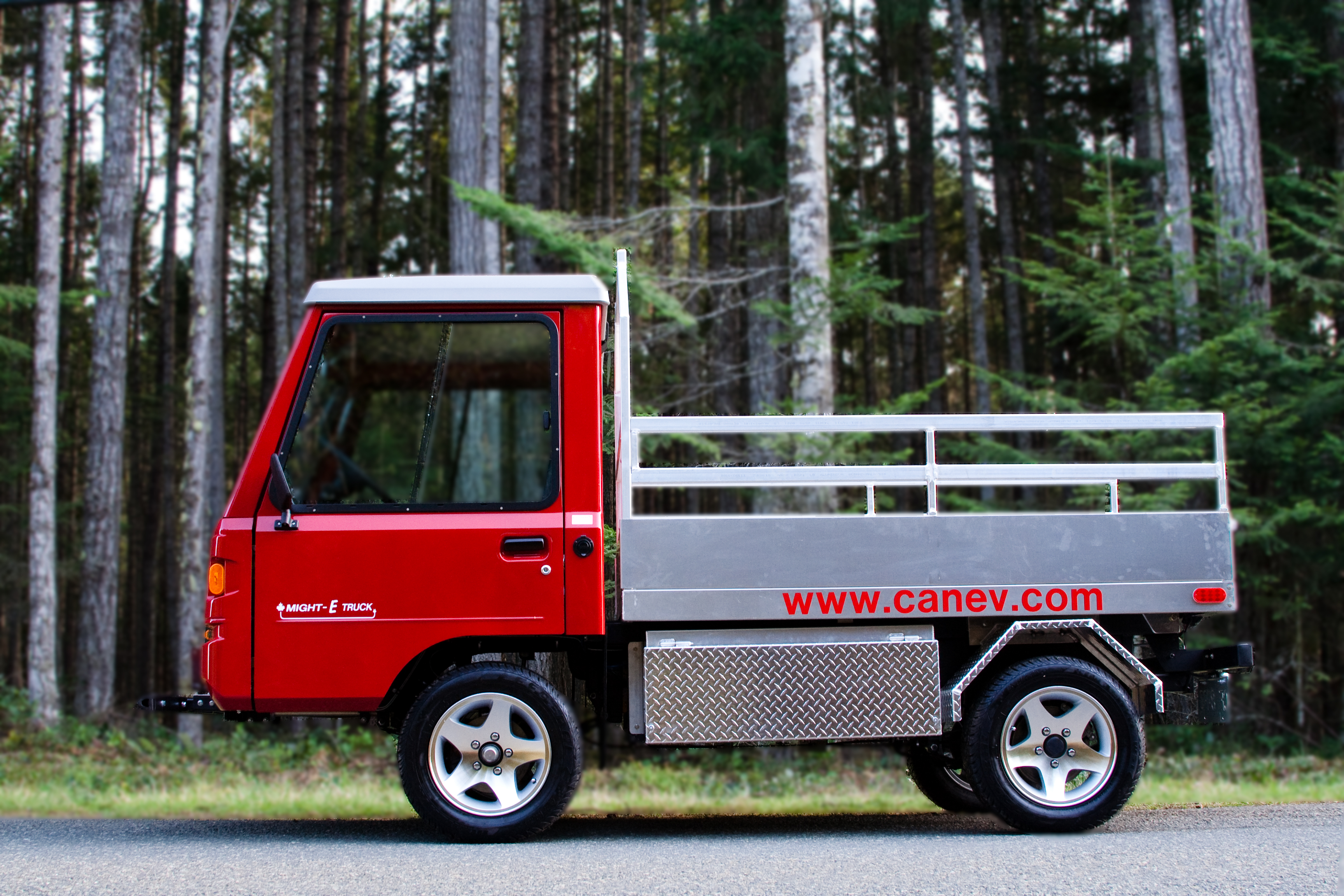
Might-E Truck from Canadian Electric Vehicles

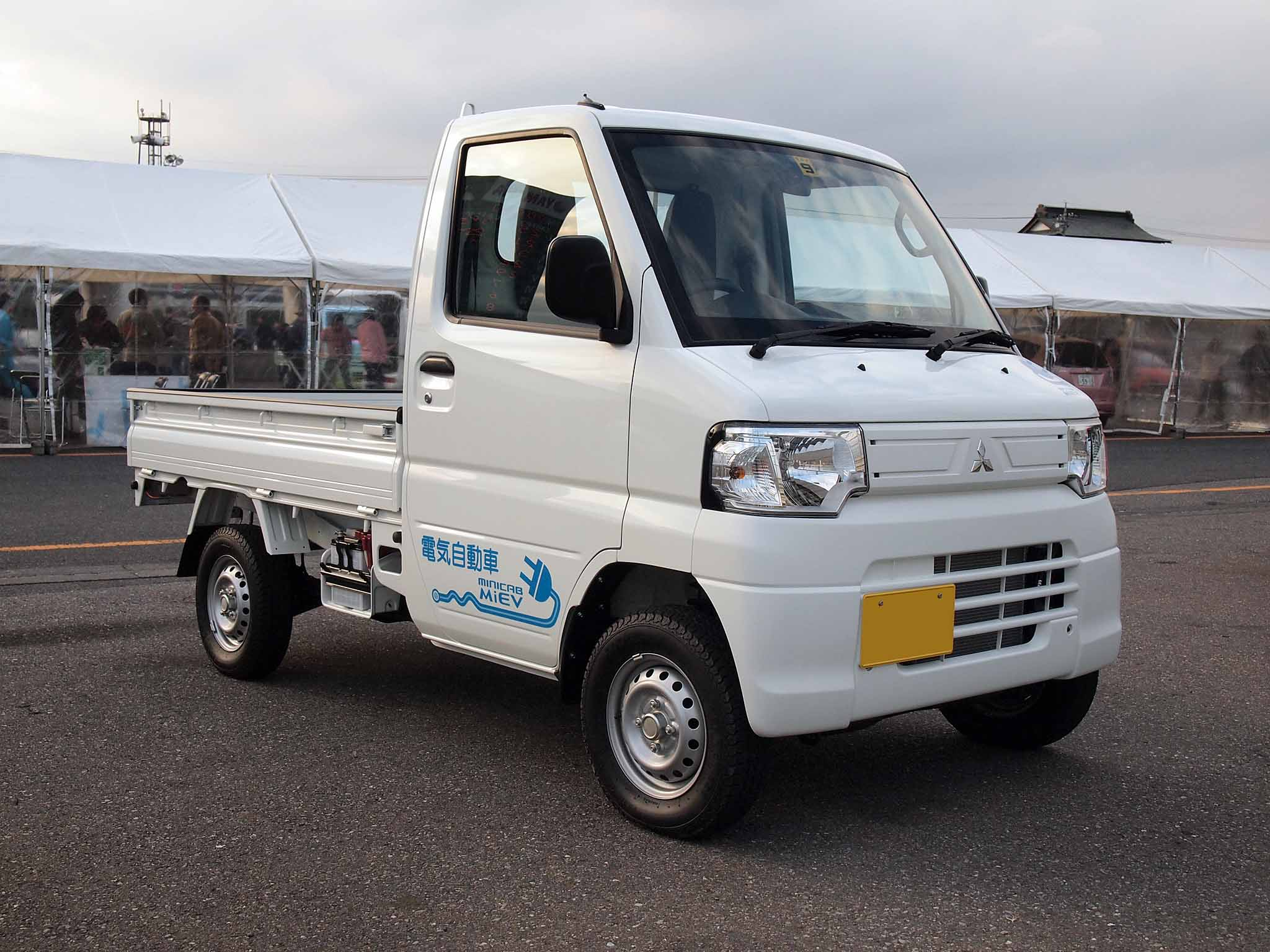
Mitsubishi Minicab MiEV battery-electric truck

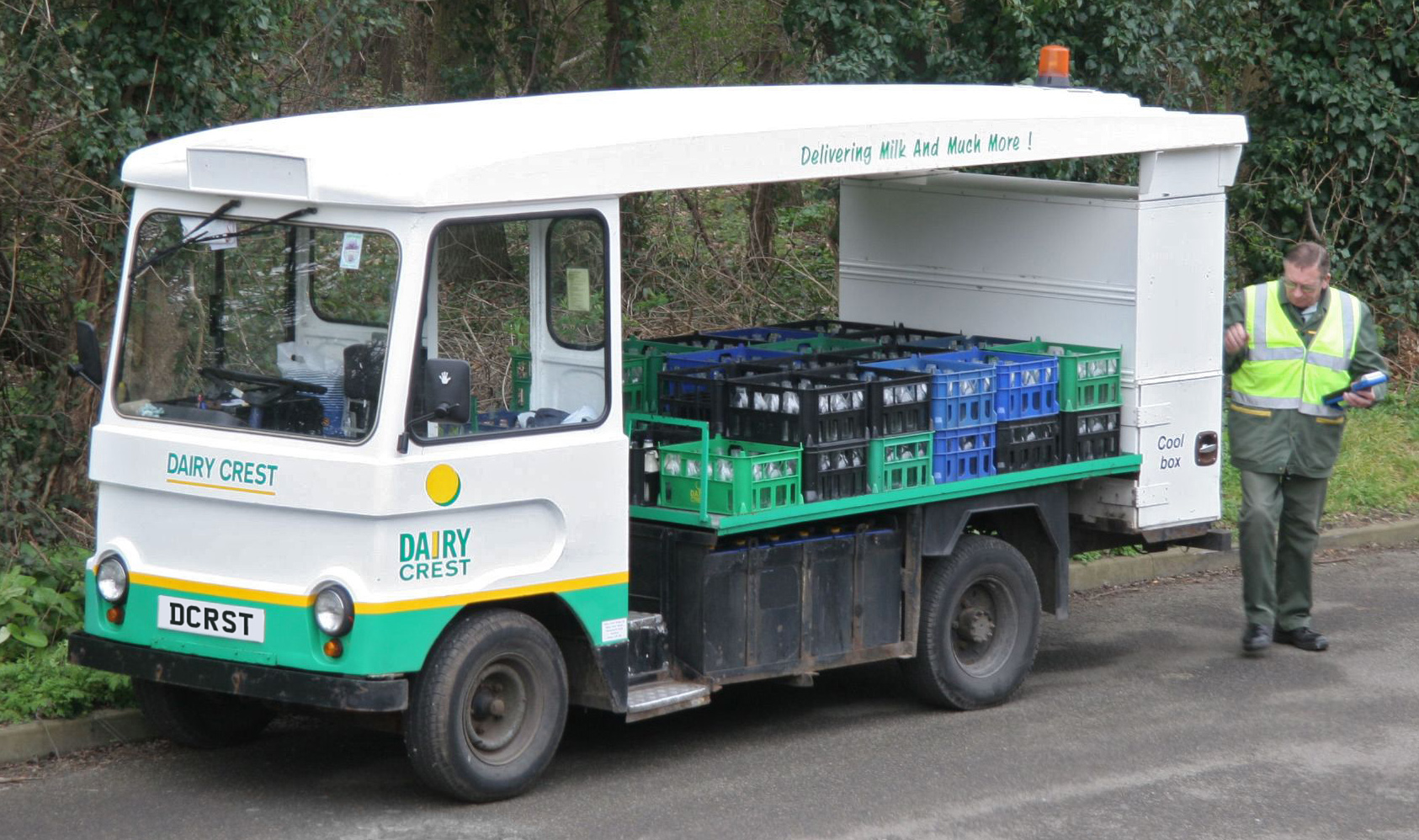
Dairy Crest electric milk float truck

=== Very light ===
Popular in Europe and Asia, many mini-trucks are factory redesigns of light automobiles, usually with monocoque bodies. Specialized designs with substantial frames such as the Italian Piaggio shown here are based upon Japanese designs (in this case by Daihatsu) and are popular for use in "old town" sections of European cities that often have very narrow alleyways.

Regardless of name, these small trucks serve a wide range of uses. In Japan, they are regulated under the Kei car laws, which allow vehicle owners a break in taxes for buying a smaller and less-powerful vehicle (currently, the engine is limited to 660 cc displacement). These vehicles are used as on-road utility vehicles in Japan. These Japanese-made mini-trucks that were manufactured for on-road use are competing with off-road ATVs in the United States, and import regulations require that these mini-trucks have a 25 mph (40 km/h) speed governor as they are classified as low-speed vehicles. These vehicles have found uses in construction, large campuses (government, university, and industrial), agriculture, cattle ranches, amusement parks, and replacements for golf carts.

Major mini-truck manufacturers and their brands include: Daihatsu Hijet, Honda Acty, Tata Ace, Mazda Scrum, Mitsubishi Minicab, Subaru Sambar, and Suzuki Carry.

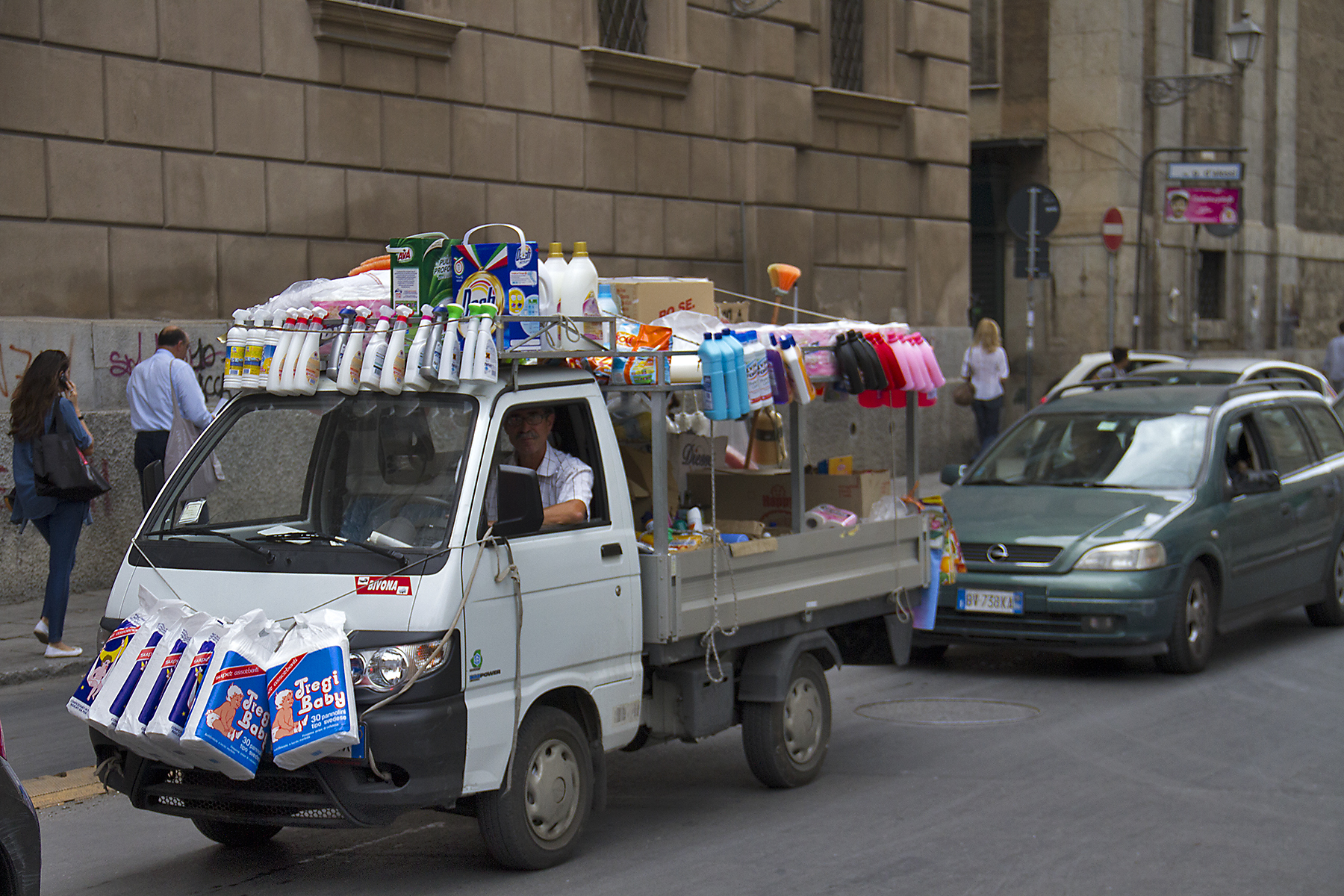
Piaggio Porter in Palermo

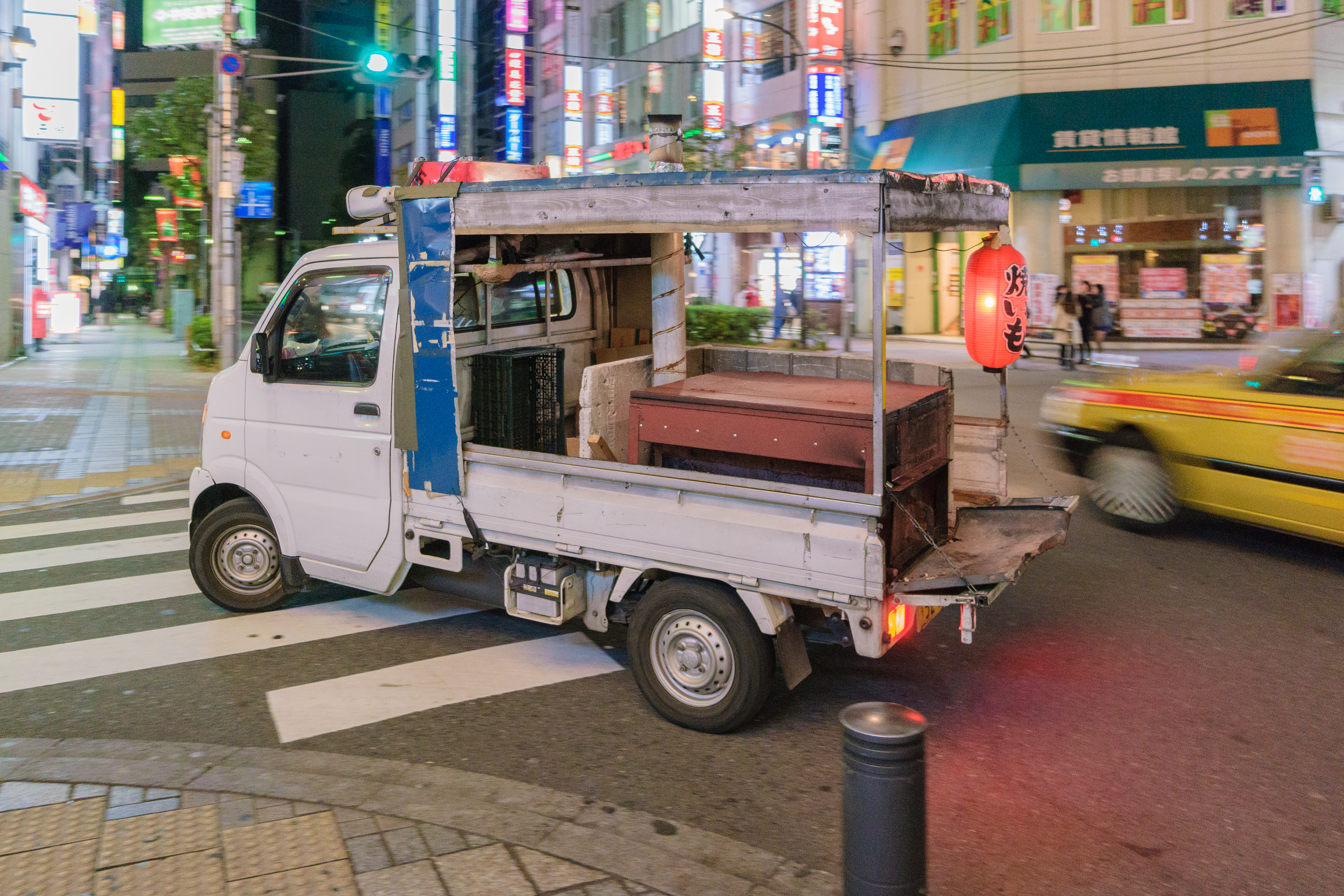
Suzuki Carry in Taiwan

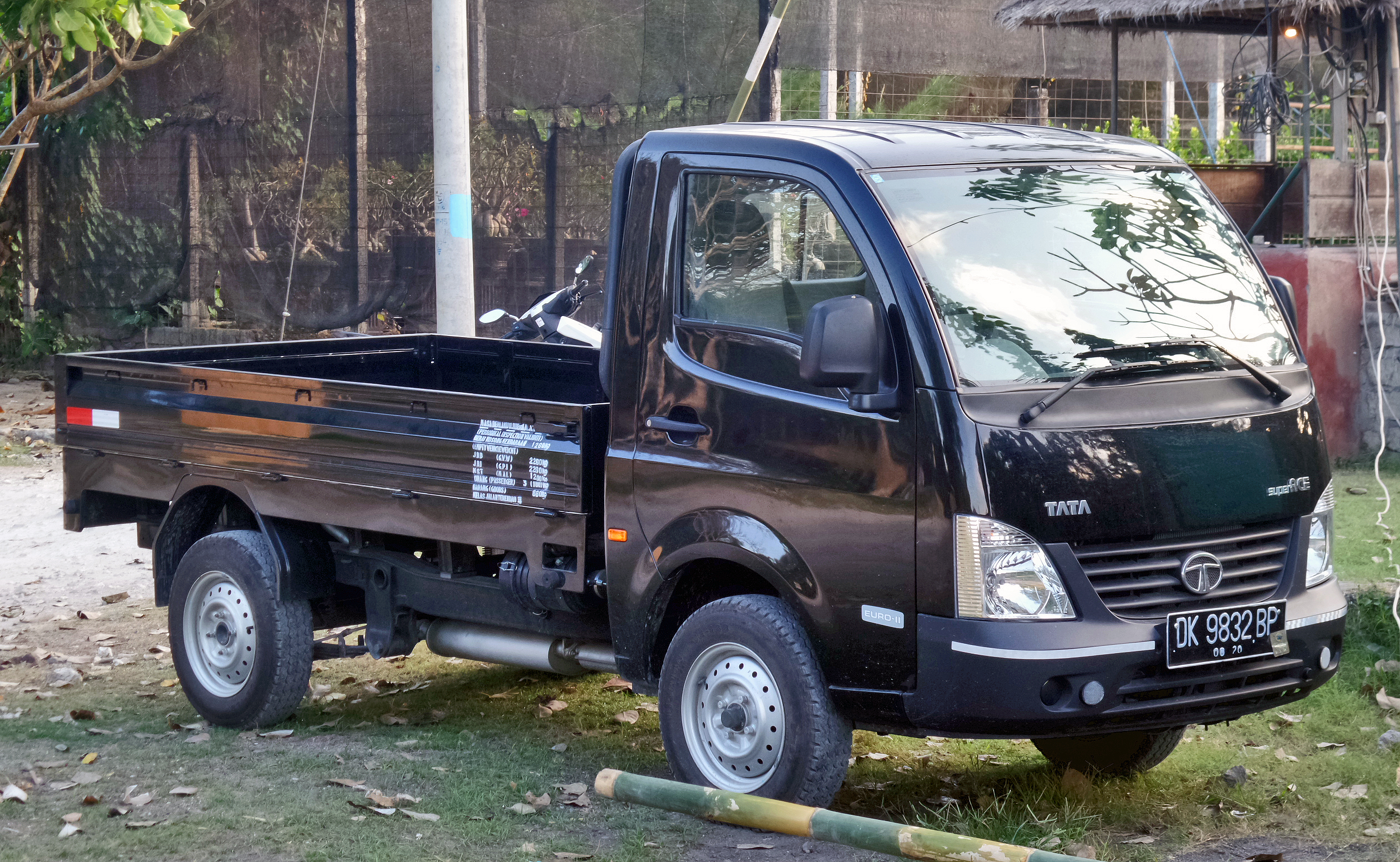
Tata Super Ace in Indonesia

=== Light ===
Light trucks are car-sized (in the US, no more than 13,900 lb (6.3 t)) and are used by individuals and businesses alike. In the EU they may not weigh more than 3.5 t (7,700 lb) and are allowed to be driven with a driving licence for cars.

Pickup trucks, called utes in Australia and New Zealand, are common in North America and some regions of Latin America, Asia, and Africa, but not so in Europe, where this size of commercial vehicle is most often made as vans.

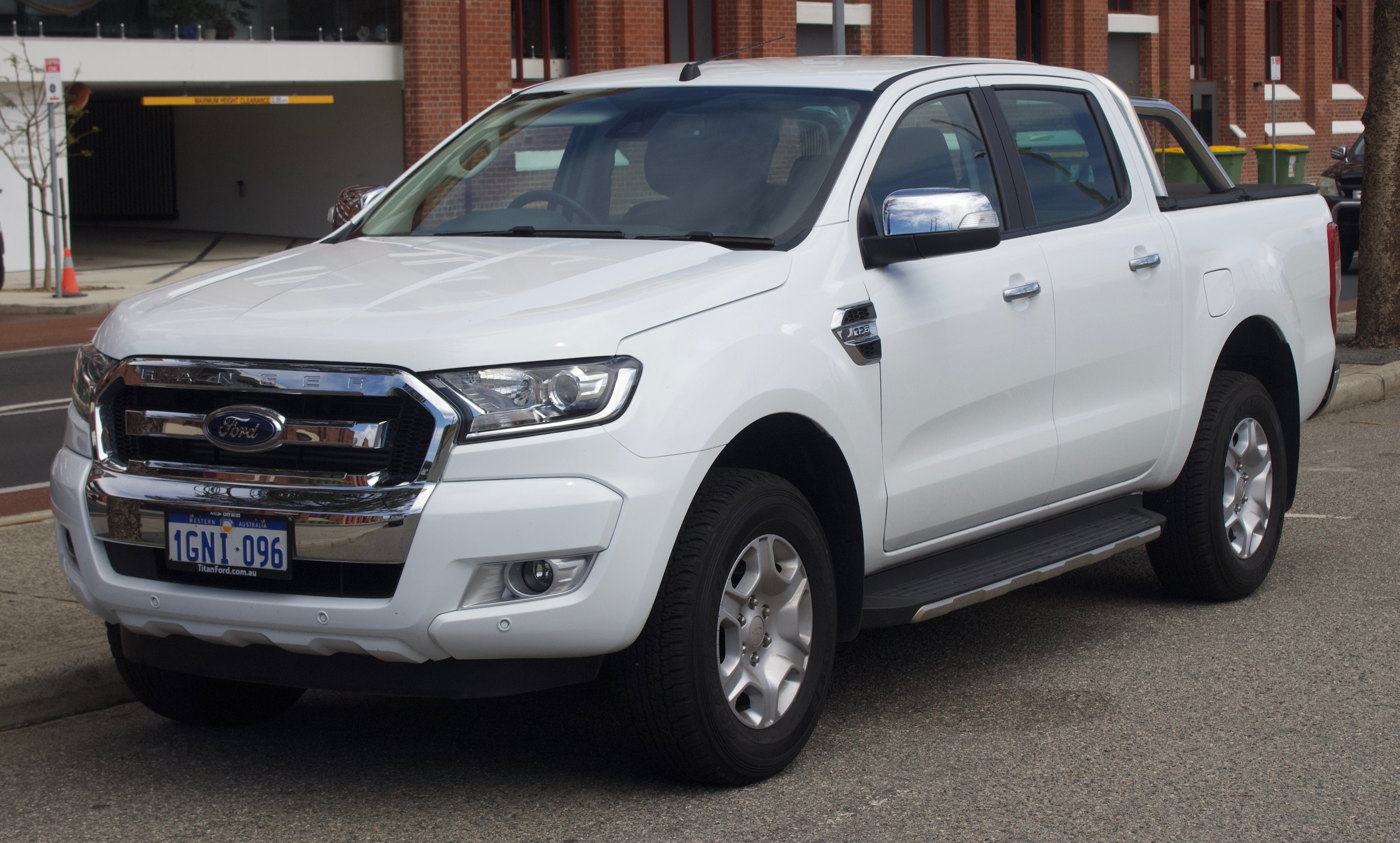
Ford Ranger pickup truck

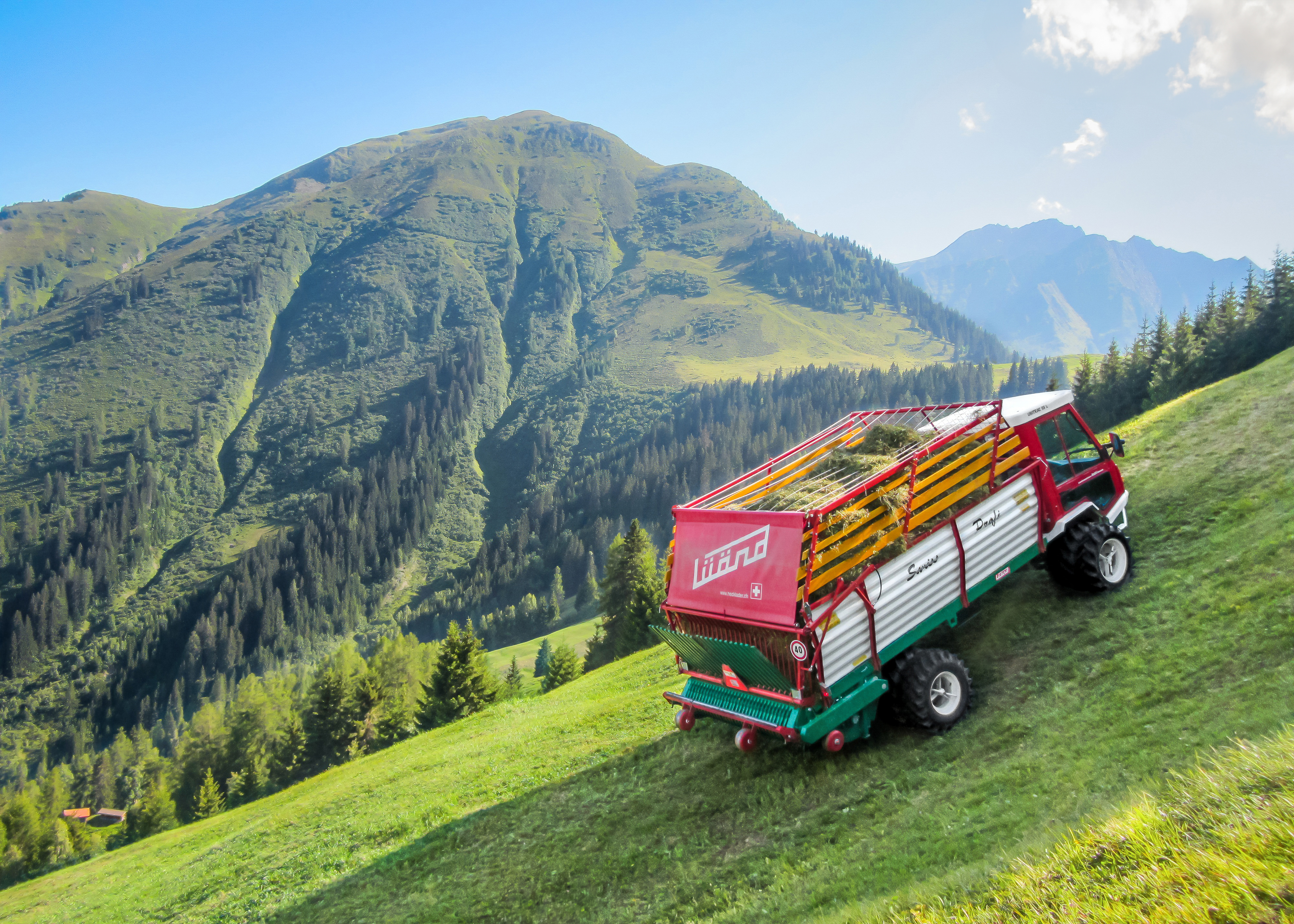
Lindner Unitrac 95L truck harvesting hay in Switzerland

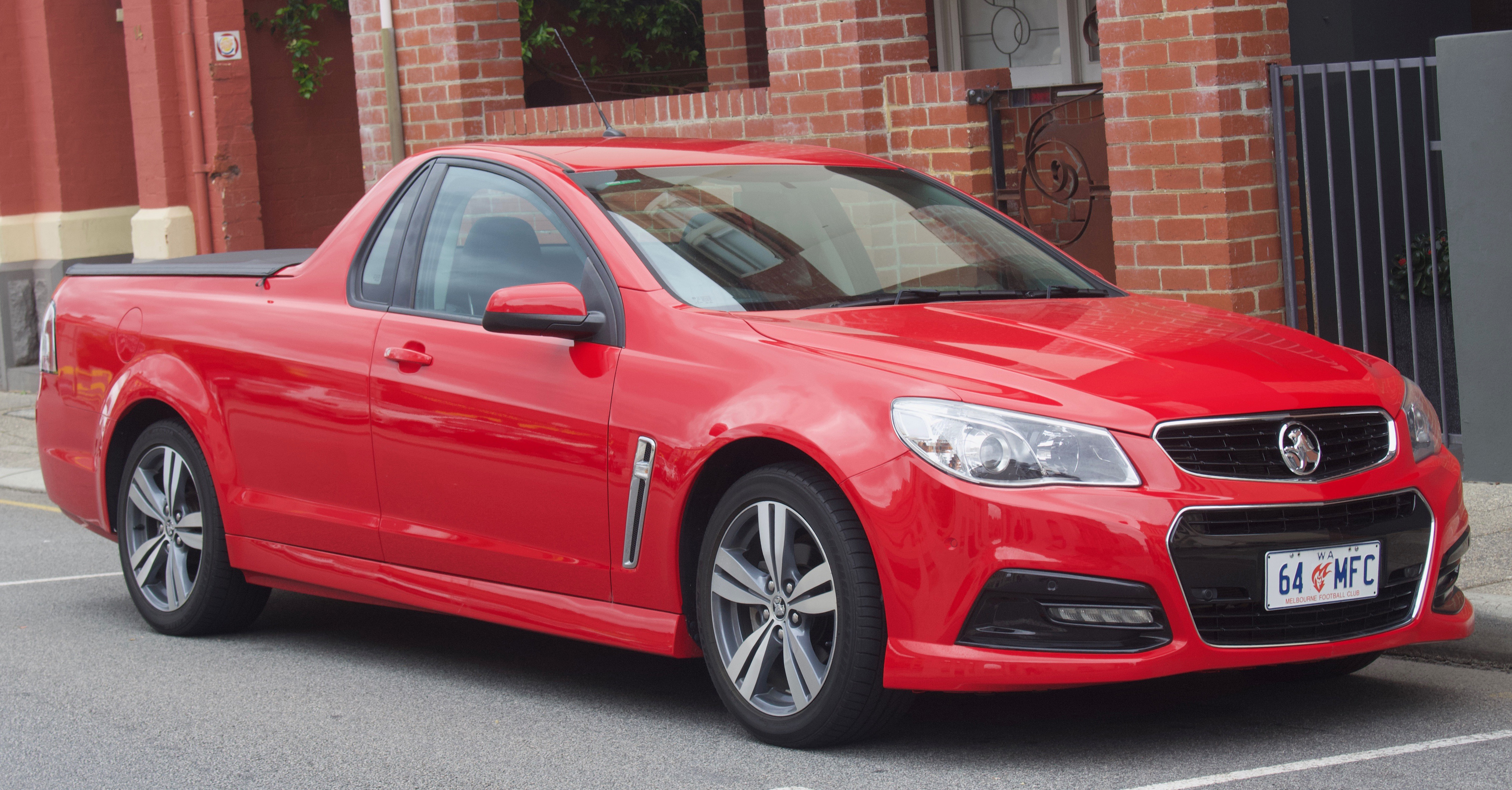
Holden Ute (VF) in Australia

=== Medium ===
Medium trucks are larger than light but smaller than heavy trucks. In the US, they are defined as weighing between 13,000 and 33,000 lb (5.9 and 15.0 t). For the UK and the EU the weight is between 3.5 and 7.5 t (7,700 and 16,500 lb). Local delivery and public service (dump trucks, garbage trucks and fire-fighting trucks) are normally around this size.

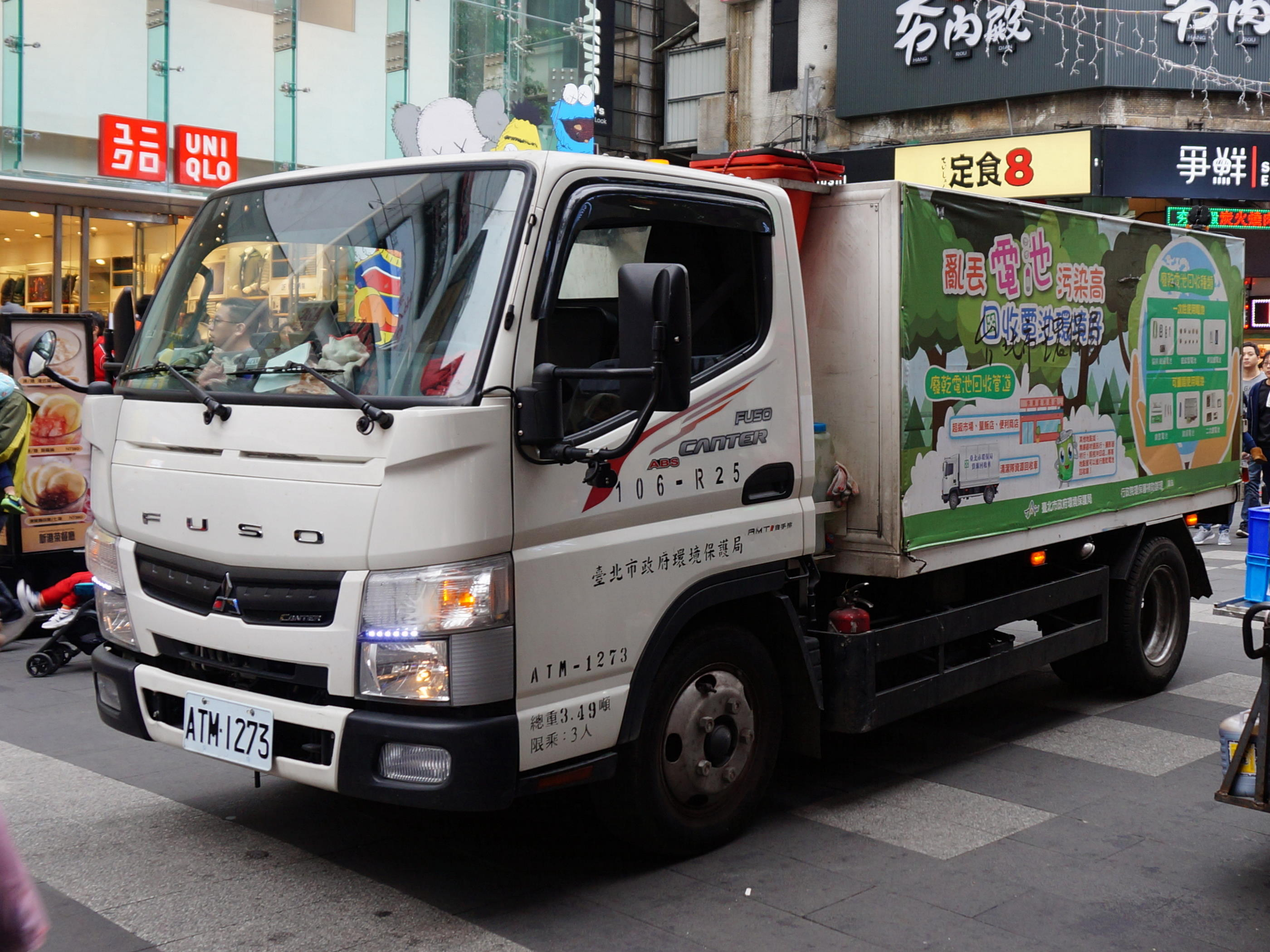
Fuso Canter (8th gen) in Taiwan

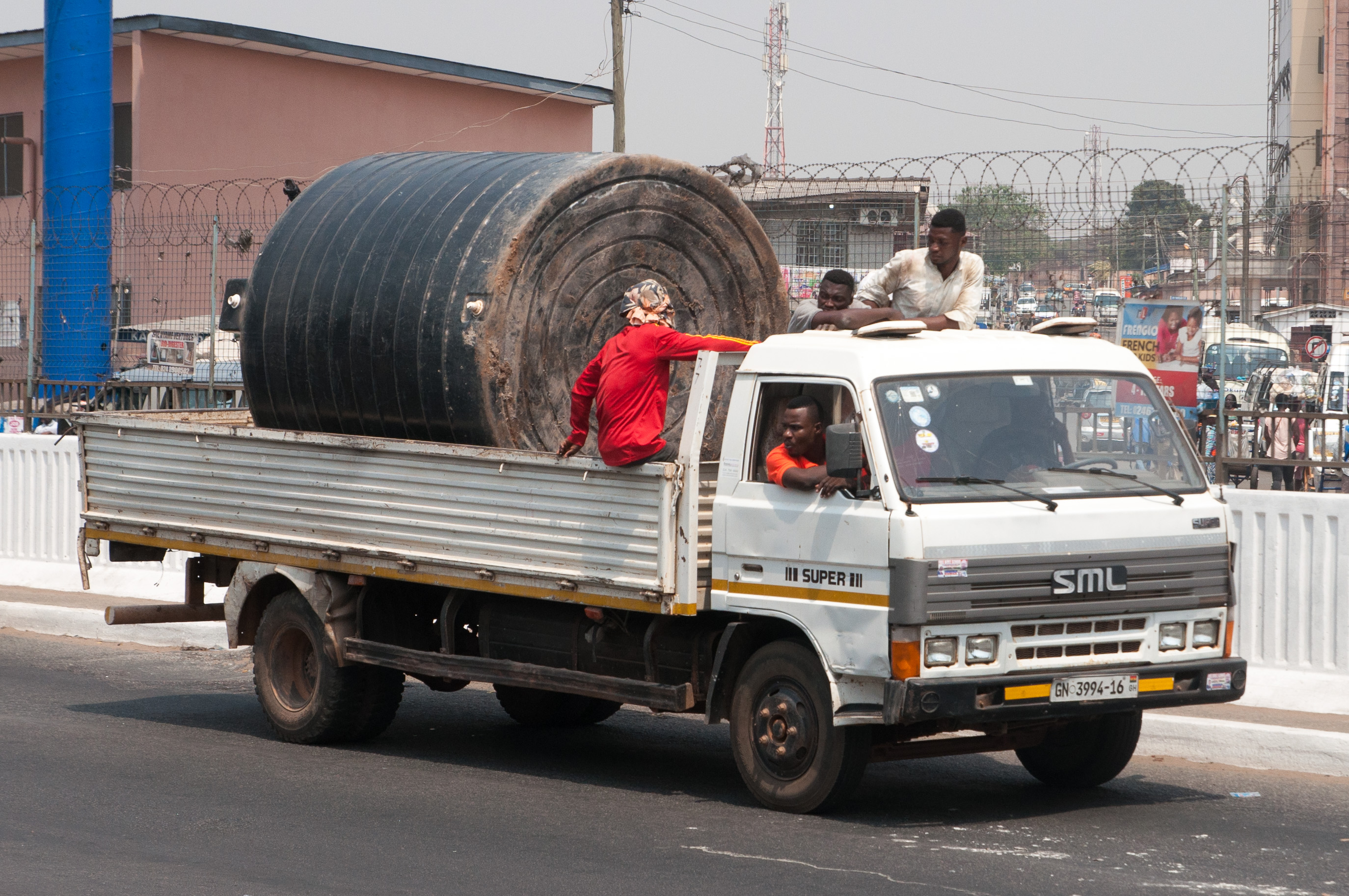
SML Isuzu in Ghana

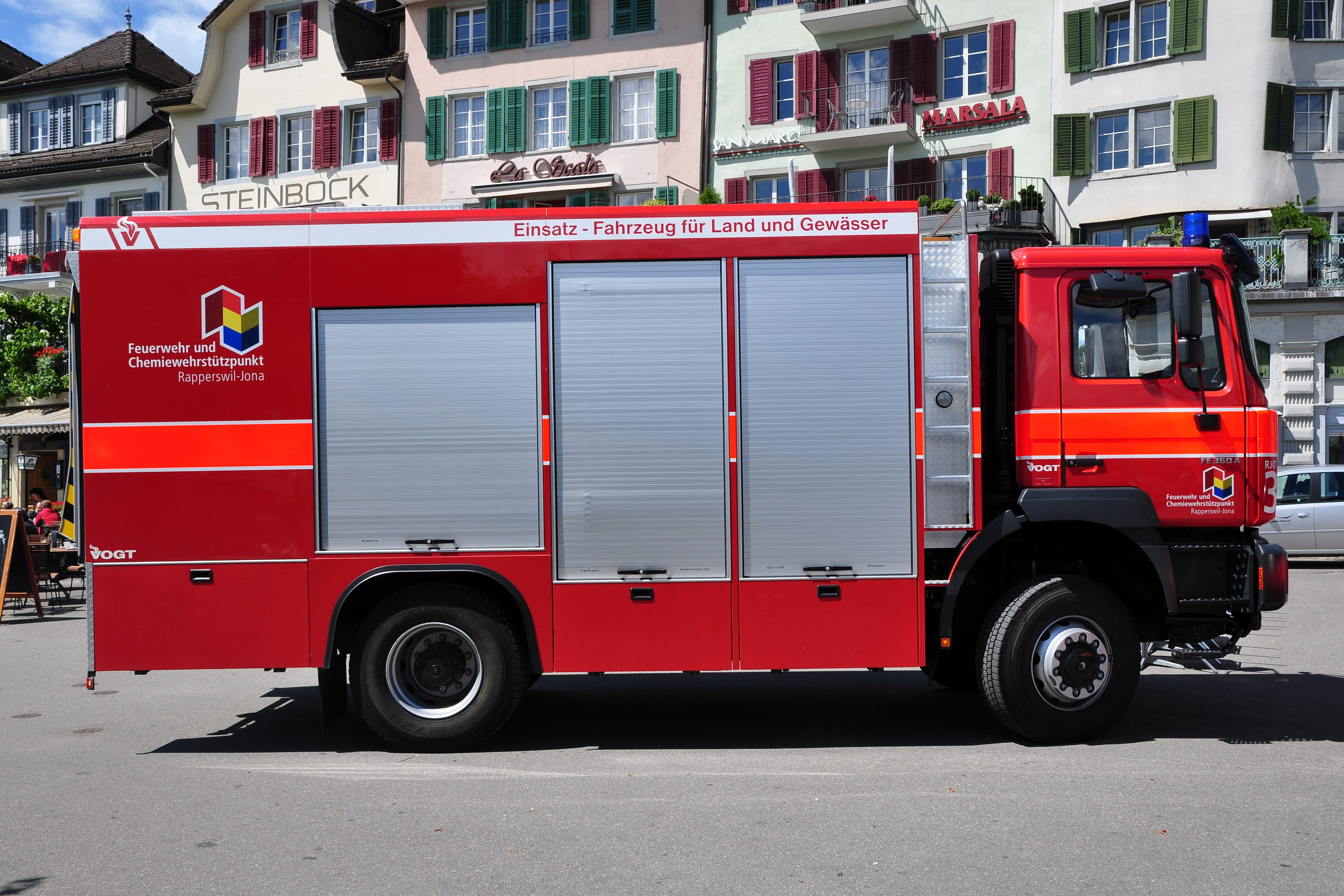
Fire-fighting truck in Switzerland

=== Heavy ===
Heavy trucks are the largest on-road trucks, Class 8. These include vocational applications such as heavy dump trucks, concrete pump trucks, and refuse hauling, as well as ubiquitous long-haul 4x2 and 6×4 tractor units.

Road damage and wear increase very rapidly with the axle weight. The number of steering axles and the suspension type also influence the amount of the road wear. In many countries with good roads a six-axle truck may have a maximum weight of 44 t (97,000 lb) or more.

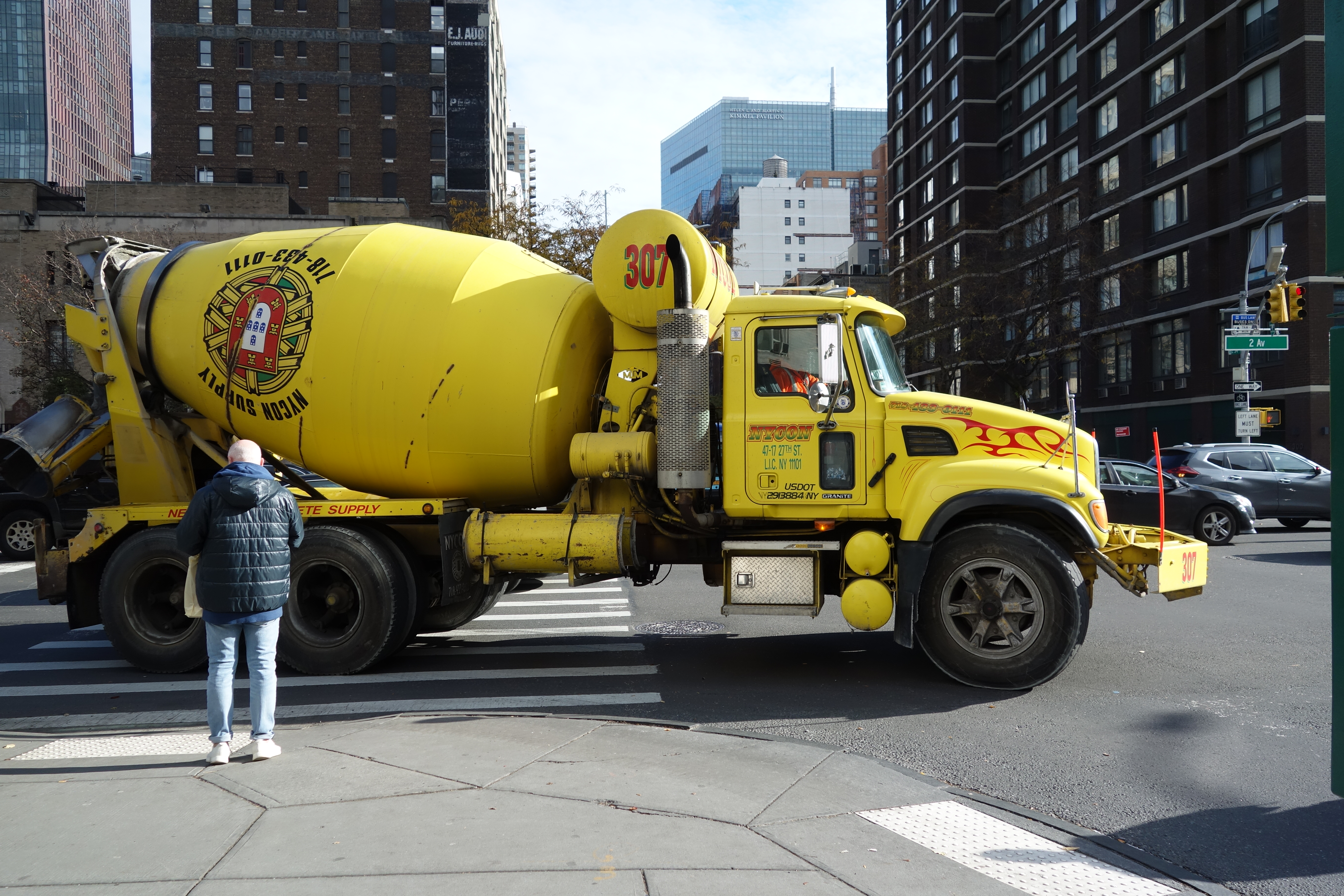
A cement mixer

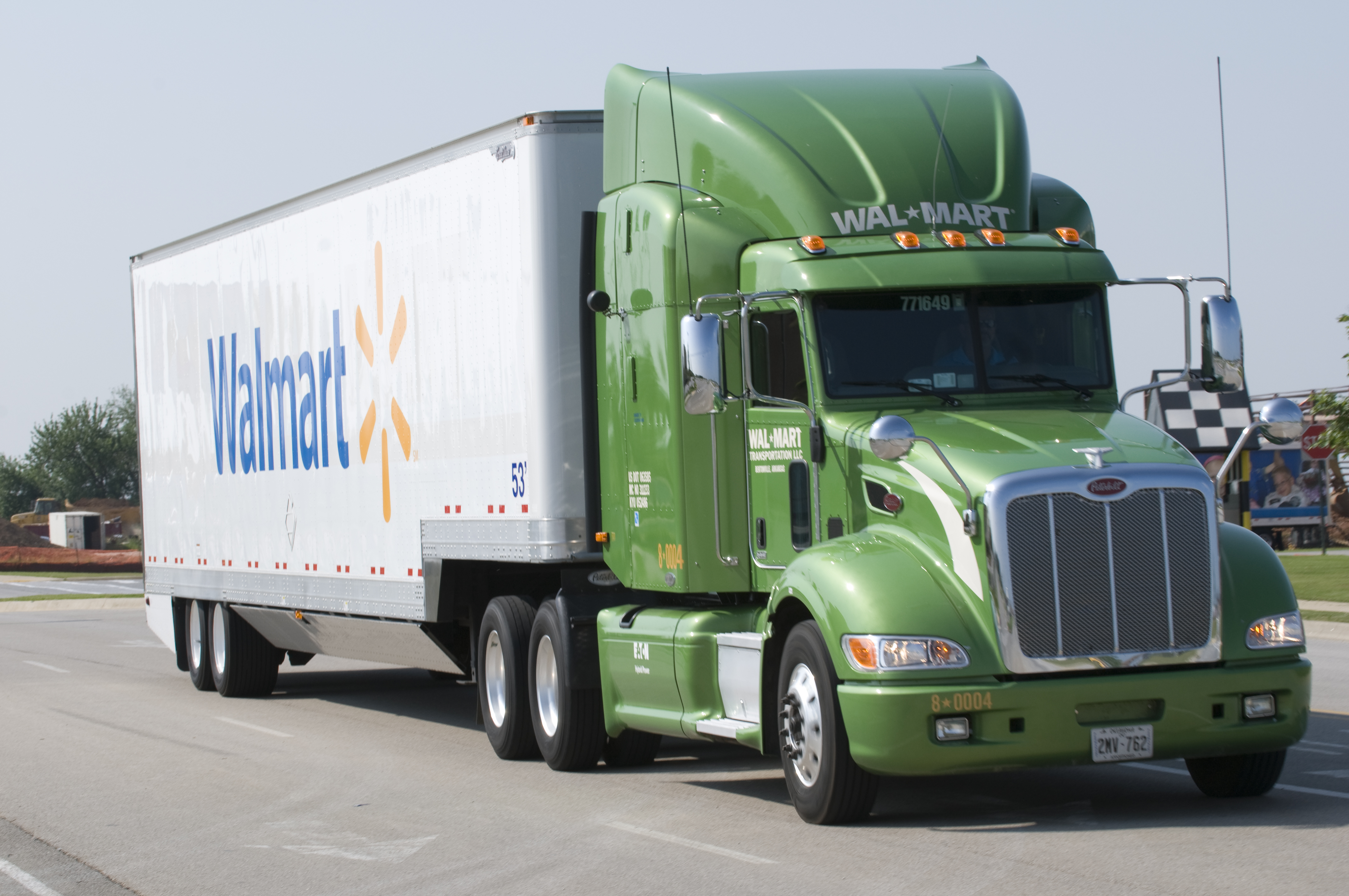
A 6×4 truck hauling a Walmart container

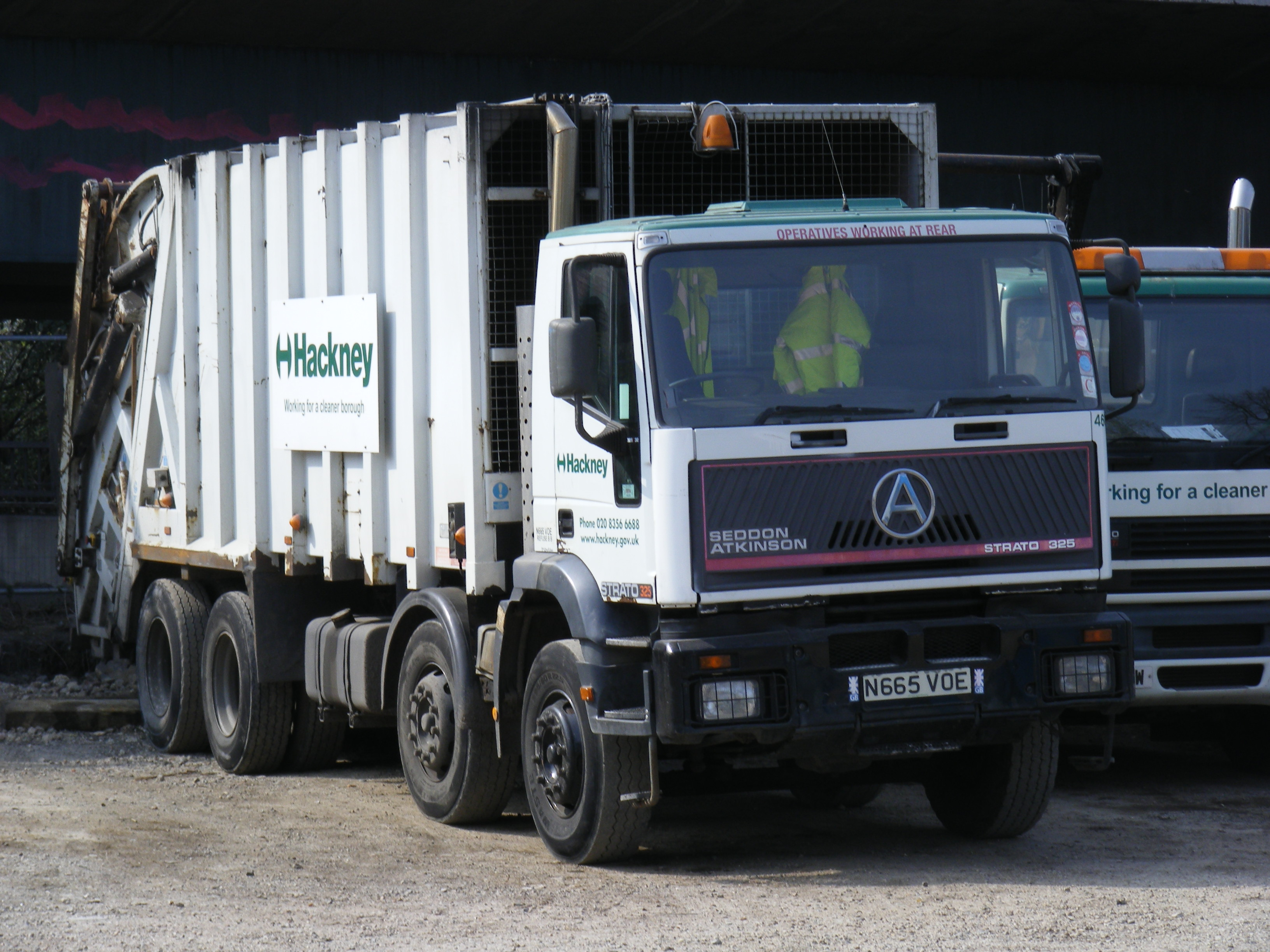
Seddon Atkinson Stratos refuse compactor

=== Off-road ===
Off-road trucks include standard, extra heavy-duty highway-legal trucks, typically outfitted with off-road features such as a front driving axle and special tires for applications such as logging and construction, and purpose-built off-road vehicles unconstrained by weight limits, like mining trucks.

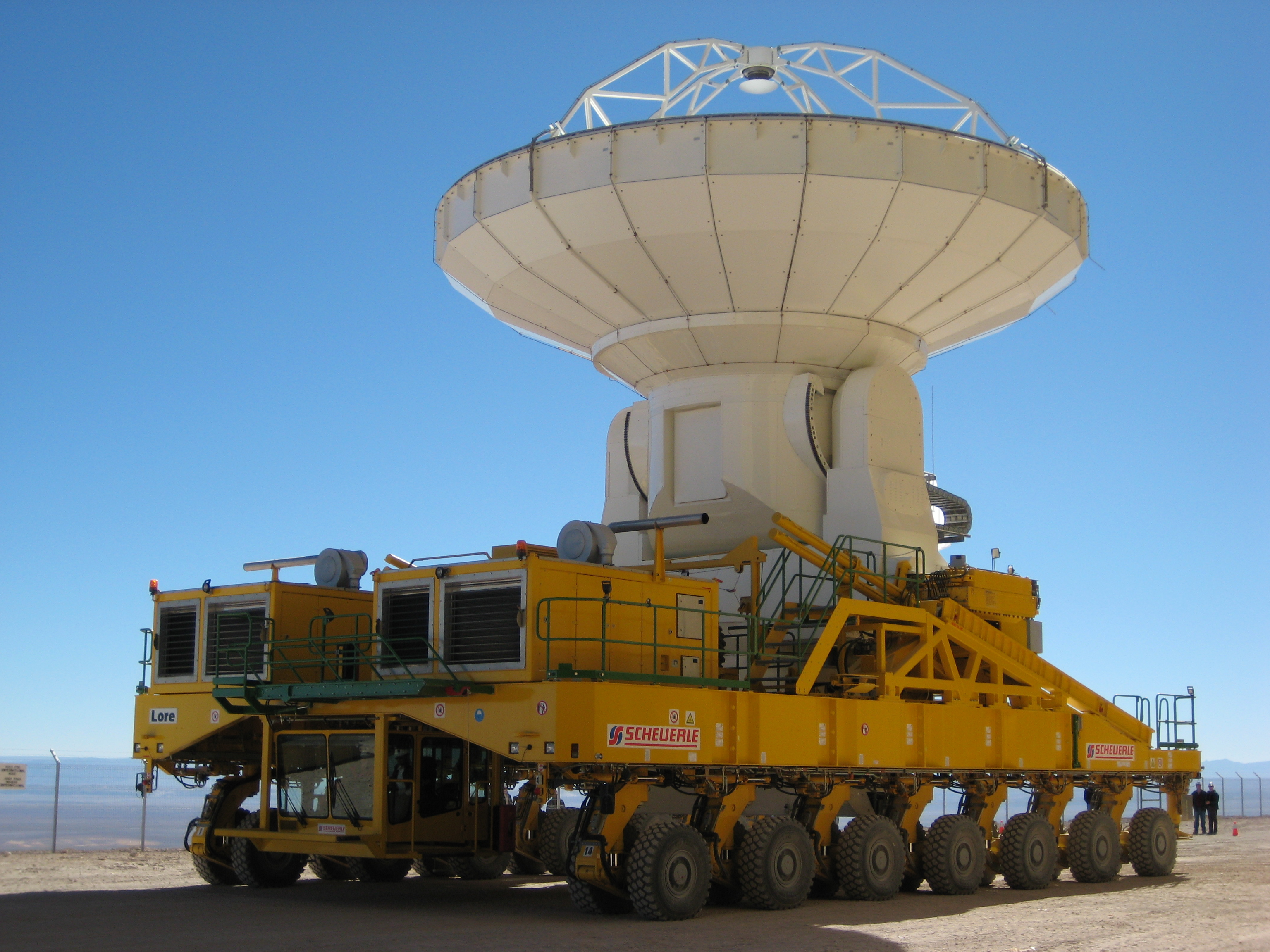
ALMA antenna transporter with 28 tires

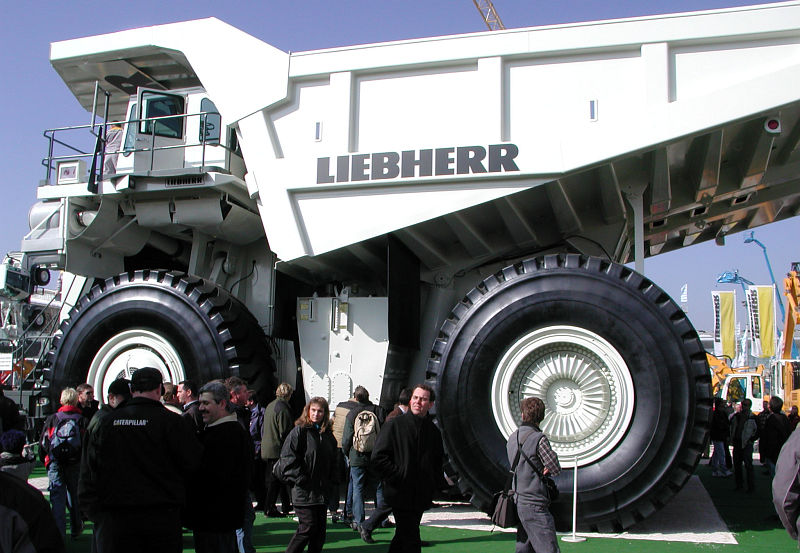
Liebherr T 282B diesel-electric mining truck

BelAZ 75710, the biggest dump truck ever built

=== Maximum sizes by country ===
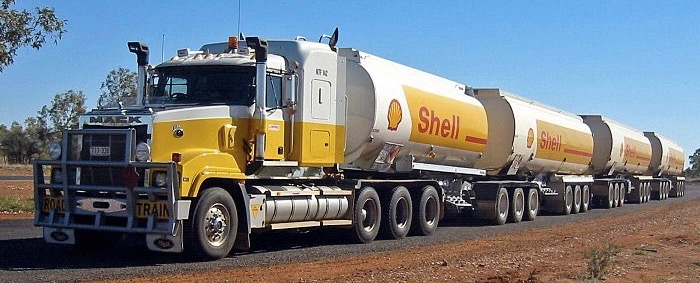
A Mack Titan road train in Australia

Australia has complex regulations over weight and length, including axle spacing, type of axle/axle group, rear overhang, kingpin to rear of trailer, drawbar length, ground clearance, as well as height and width laws. These limits are some of the highest in the world, a B-double can weigh 62.5 t (61.5 long tons; 68.9 short tons) and be 25 m (82 ft) long, and road trains used in the outback can weigh 172 t (169.3 long tons; 189.6 short tons) and be 53.5 m (176 ft) long.

The European Union also has complex regulations. The number and spacing of axles, steering, single or dual tires, and suspension type all affect maximum weights. Length of a truck, of a trailer, from axle to hitch point, kingpin to rear of trailer, and turning radius are all regulated. In additions, there are special rules for carrying containers, and countries can set their own rules for local traffic.

The United States Federal Bridge Law deals with the relation between the gross weight of the truck, the number of axles, the weight on and the spacing between the axles that the truck can have on the Interstate highway system. Each State determines the maximum permissible vehicle, combination, and axle weight on state and local roads.

Country	Maximum with three axles	With one trailer	Maximum combination
Australia	23 t (22.6 long tons; 25.4 short tons)	12 m (39 ft)	172 t (169.3 long tons; 189.6 short tons); 53.5 m (176 ft)
China	25 t (24.6 long tons; 27.6 short tons); 12 m (39 ft)	49 t (48.2 long tons; 54.0 short tons); 16.5 m (54 ft)	55 t (54.1 long tons; 60.6 short tons); 18.75 m (62 ft)
EU	26 t (25.6 long tons; 28.7 short tons); 12 m (39 ft)	16.5 m (54 ft)	44 t (43.3 long tons; 48.5 short tons); 18.75 m (62 ft)
Finland	28 t (27.6 long tons; 30.9 short tons); 13 m (43 ft)	76 t (74.8 long tons; 83.8 short tons); 34.5 m (113 ft 2 in)	76 t (74.8 long tons; 83.8 short tons); 34.5 m (113 ft)
Ireland	26 t (25.6 long tons; 28.7 short tons); 12 m (39 ft)	30 t (29.5 long tons; 33.1 short tons); 16.5 m (54 ft 2 in)	44 t (43.3 long tons; 48.5 short tons); 22 m (72 ft)
South Africa	26 t (25.6 long tons; 28.7 short tons); 12 m (39 ft)	56 t (55.1 long tons; 61.7 short tons); 18.5 m (60.7 ft)	56 t (55.1 long tons; 61.7 short tons); 22 m (72 ft)
Sweden	26 t (25.6 long tons; 28.7 short tons); 24 m (79 ft)	74 t (72.8 long tons; 81.6 short tons); 25.25 m (82 ft 10 in)	74 t (72.8 long tons; 81.6 short tons); 34.5 m (113 ft)
UK	26 t (25.6 long tons; 28.7 short tons); 12 m (39 ft)	44 t (43.3 long tons; 48.5 short tons); 16.5 m (54 ft)	44 t (43.3 long tons; 48.5 short tons); 18.75 m (62 ft)
USA (Interstate)	54,000 lb (24 t); 45 ft (13.7 m)	80,000 lb (36 t) none	80,000 lb (36 t) none

Uniquely, the State of Michigan has a gross vehicle weight limit of 164,000 lb (74 t), which is twice the U.S. federal limit. A measure to change the law was defeated in the Michigan Senate in 2019.

== Design ==
Almost all trucks share a common construction: they are made of a chassis, a cab, an area for placing cargo or equipment, axles, suspension and roadwheels, an engine and a drivetrain. Pneumatic, hydraulic, water, and electrical systems may also be present. Many also tow one or more trailers or semi-trailers.

=== Cab ===
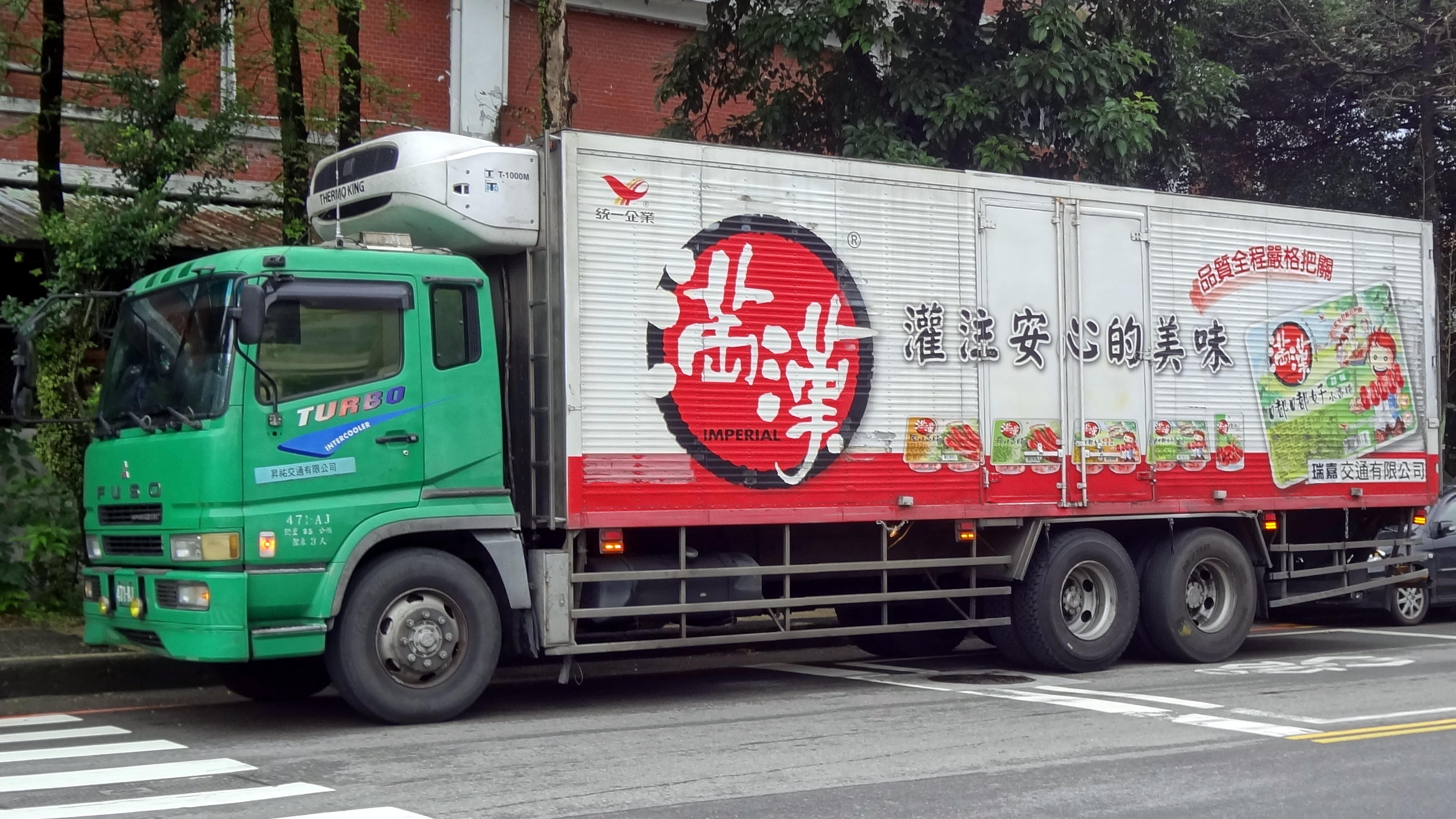
A cabover truck

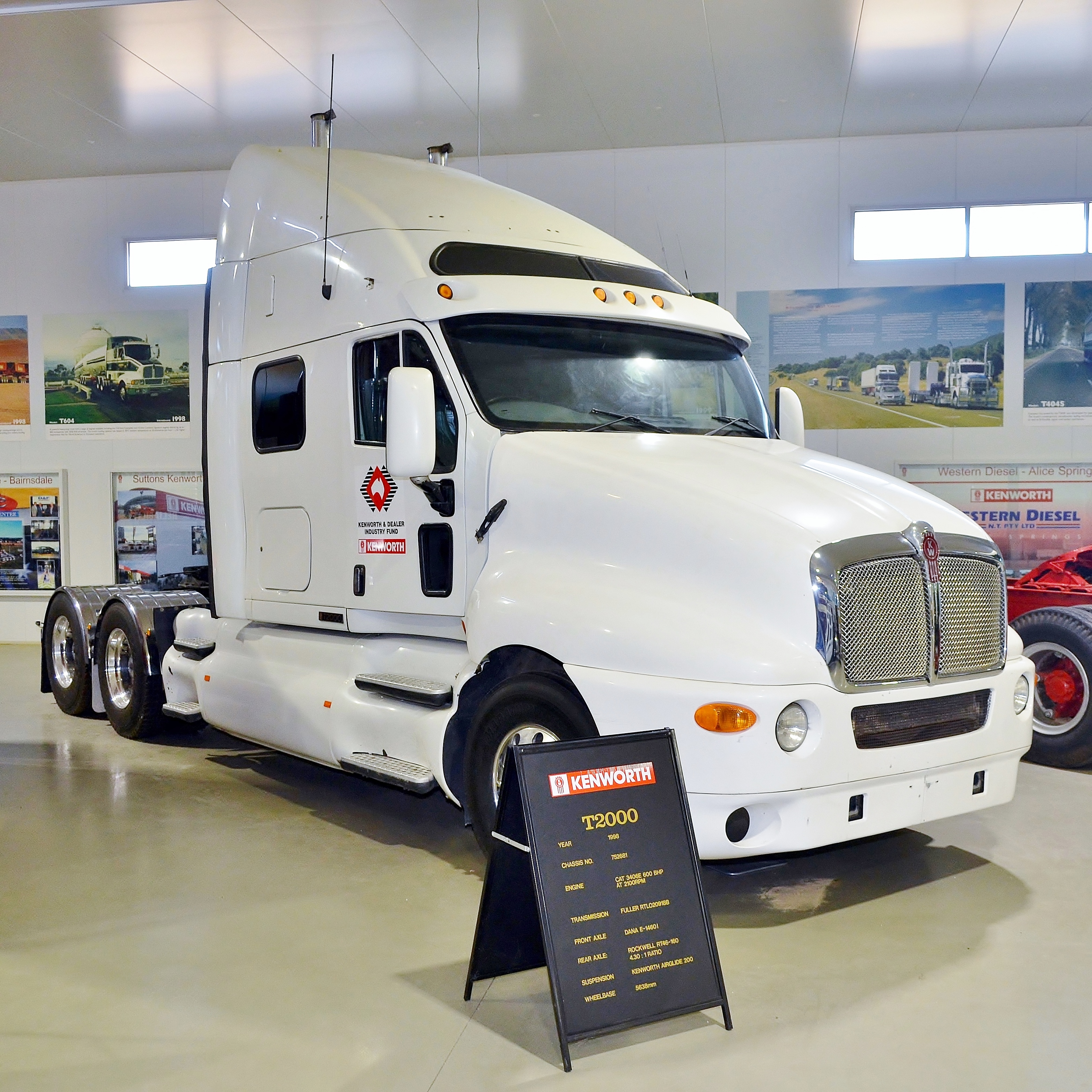
Streamlined conventional cab

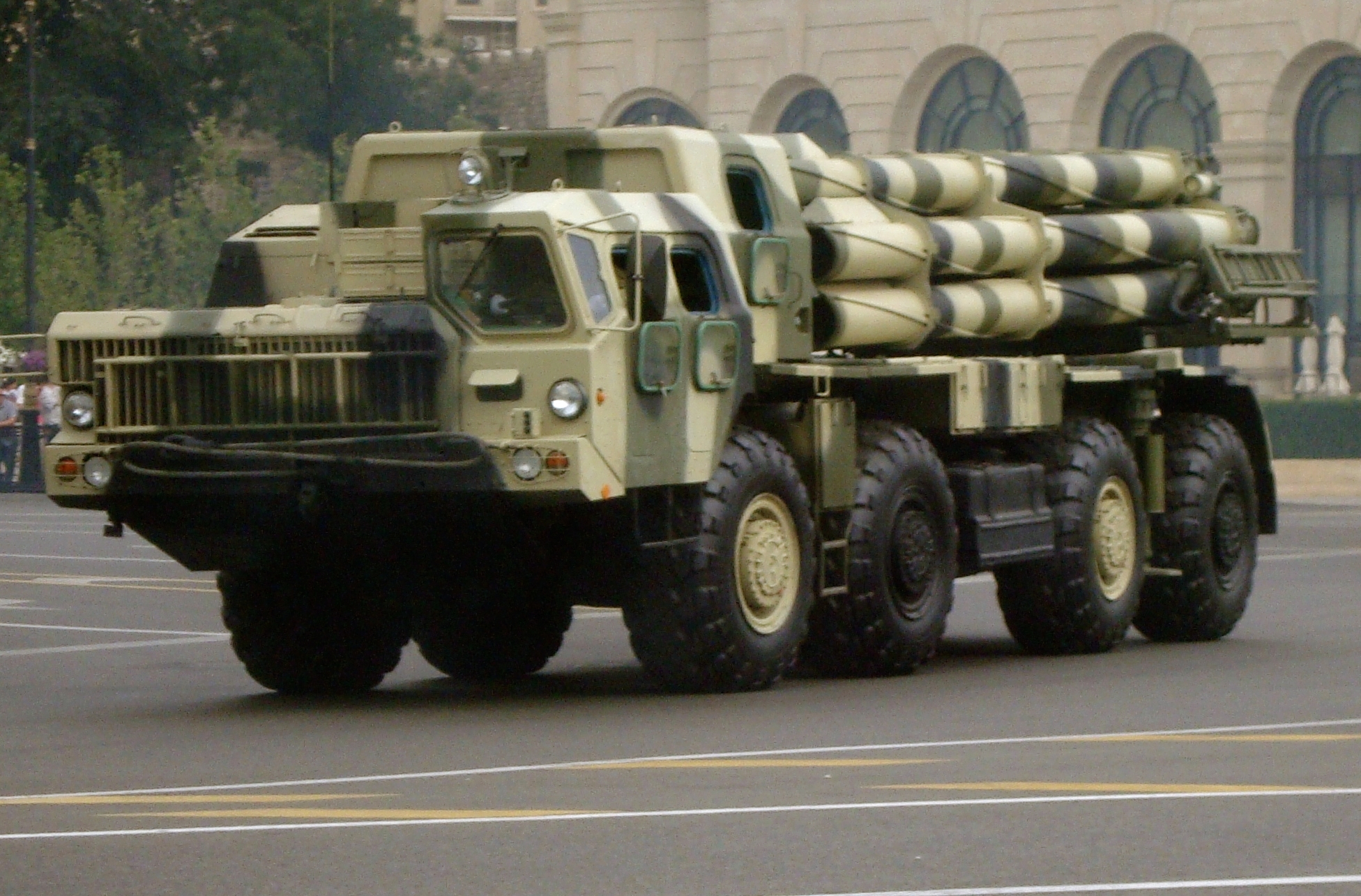
Cab beside engine

The "cab", or "cabin" is an enclosed space where the driver is seated. A "sleeper" is a compartment attached to or integral with the cab where the driver can rest while not driving, sometimes seen in semi-trailer trucks.

There are several cab configurations:

- "Cab over engine" (COE) or "flat nose"; where the driver is seated above the front axle and the engine. This design is almost ubiquitous in Europe, where overall truck lengths are strictly regulated, and is widely used in the rest of the world. They were common in North American heavy-duty trucks but lost prominence when permitted length was extended in the early 1980s. Nevertheless, this design is still popular in North America among medium- and light-duty trucks. To reach the engine, the whole cab tilts forward, earning this design the name of "tilt-cab". This type of cab is especially suited to the delivery conditions in Europe where many roads require the short turning radius afforded by the shorter wheelbase of the cab over engine layout.
- "Cab-under" is where the driver is positioned at the front at the lowest point possible as means for maximum cargo space as possible. Examples were made by Hunslet, Leyland, Bussing, Strick and Steinwinter.
- "Conventional" cabs seated the driver behind the engine, as in most passenger cars or pickup trucks. Many new cabs are very streamlined, with a sloped hood (bonnet) and other features to lower drag. Conventional cabs are the most common in North America, Australia, and China, and are known in the UK as "American cabs" and in the Netherlands as "torpedo cabs".
- "Cab beside engine" designs are used for terminal tractors at shipping yards and for other specialist vehicles carrying long loads such as pipes. This type is often made by replacing the passenger side of a cab-over truck with an extended section of the load bed.

A further step from this is the side loading forklift that can be described as a specially fabricated vehicle with the same properties as a truck of this type, in addition to the ability to pick up its own load.

=== Engines and motors ===
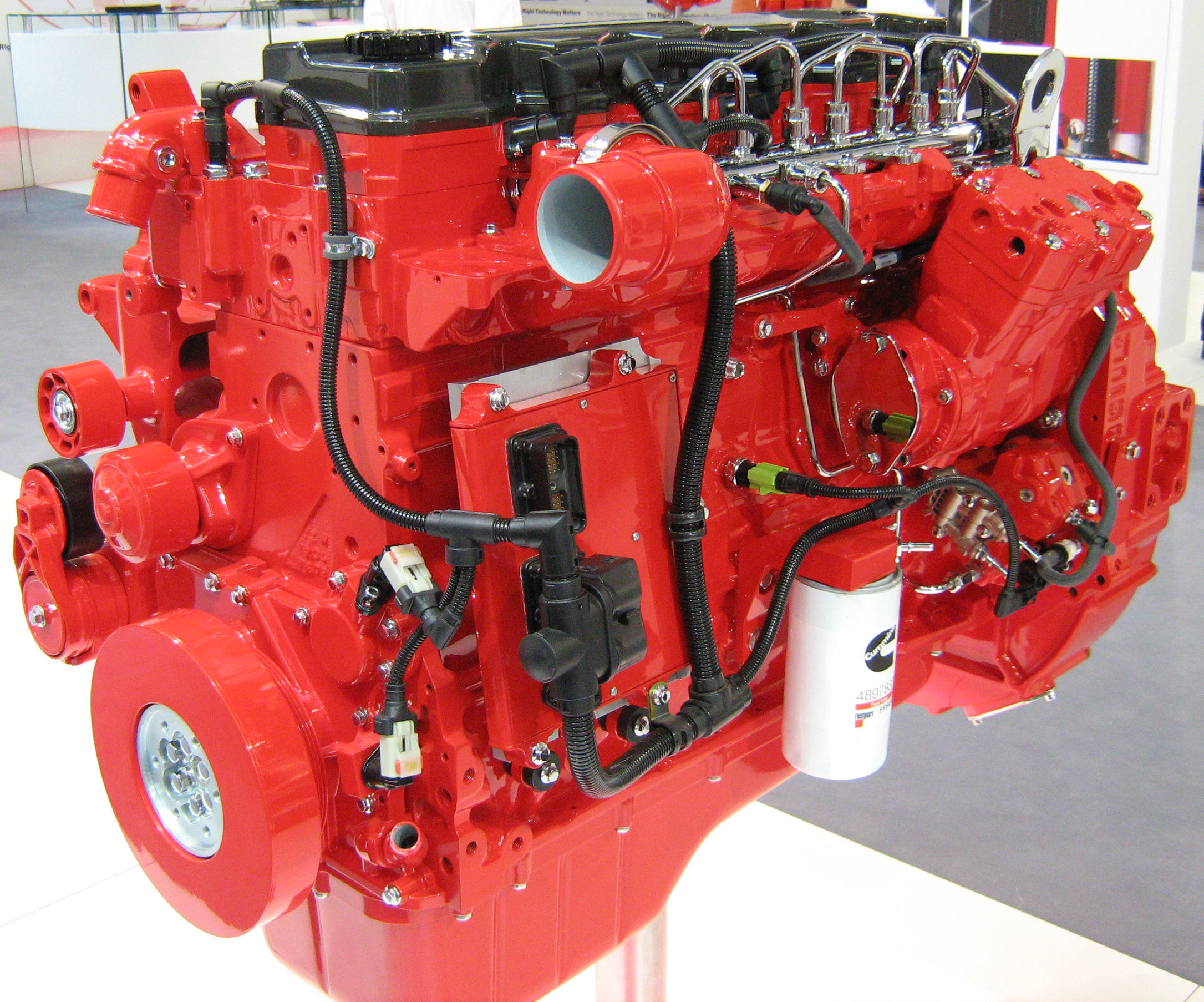
Cummins ISB 6.7L medium-duty truck diesel engine

Most small trucks such as sport utility vehicles (SUVs), vans or pickups, and even light medium-duty trucks in North America, China, and Russia use gasoline engines (petrol engines), but many diesel engined models are now being produced. Most of the heavier trucks use four-stroke diesel engines with a turbocharger and intercooler. Huge off-highway trucks use locomotive-type engines such as a V12 Detroit Diesel two stroke engine. A large proportion of refuse trucks in the United States employ CNG (compressed natural gas) engines for their low fuel cost and reduced carbon emissions.

A significant proportion of North American manufactured trucks use an engine built by the last remaining major independent engine manufacturer (Cummins) but most global OEMs such as Volvo Trucks and Daimler AG promote their own "captive" engines.

In the European Union, all new truck engines must comply with Euro VI emission regulations, and Euro 7 from the late 2020s has stricter exhaust limits and also limits air pollution from brakes and tires.

As of 2019 several alternative technologies are competing to displace the use of diesel engines in heavy trucks. CNG engines are widely used in the US refuse industry and in concrete mixers, among other short-range vocations, but range limitations have prevented their broader uptake in freight hauling applications. Heavy electric trucks and hydrogen-powered trucks are new to the market in 2021, but major freight haulers are interested. Although cars will be first the phase-out of fossil fuel vehicles includes trucks. According to The Economist magazine "Electric lorries will probably run on hydrogen, not batteries, which are too expensive." Other researchers say that once faster chargers are available batteries will become competitive against diesel for all, except perhaps the heaviest, trucks.

=== Drivetrain ===
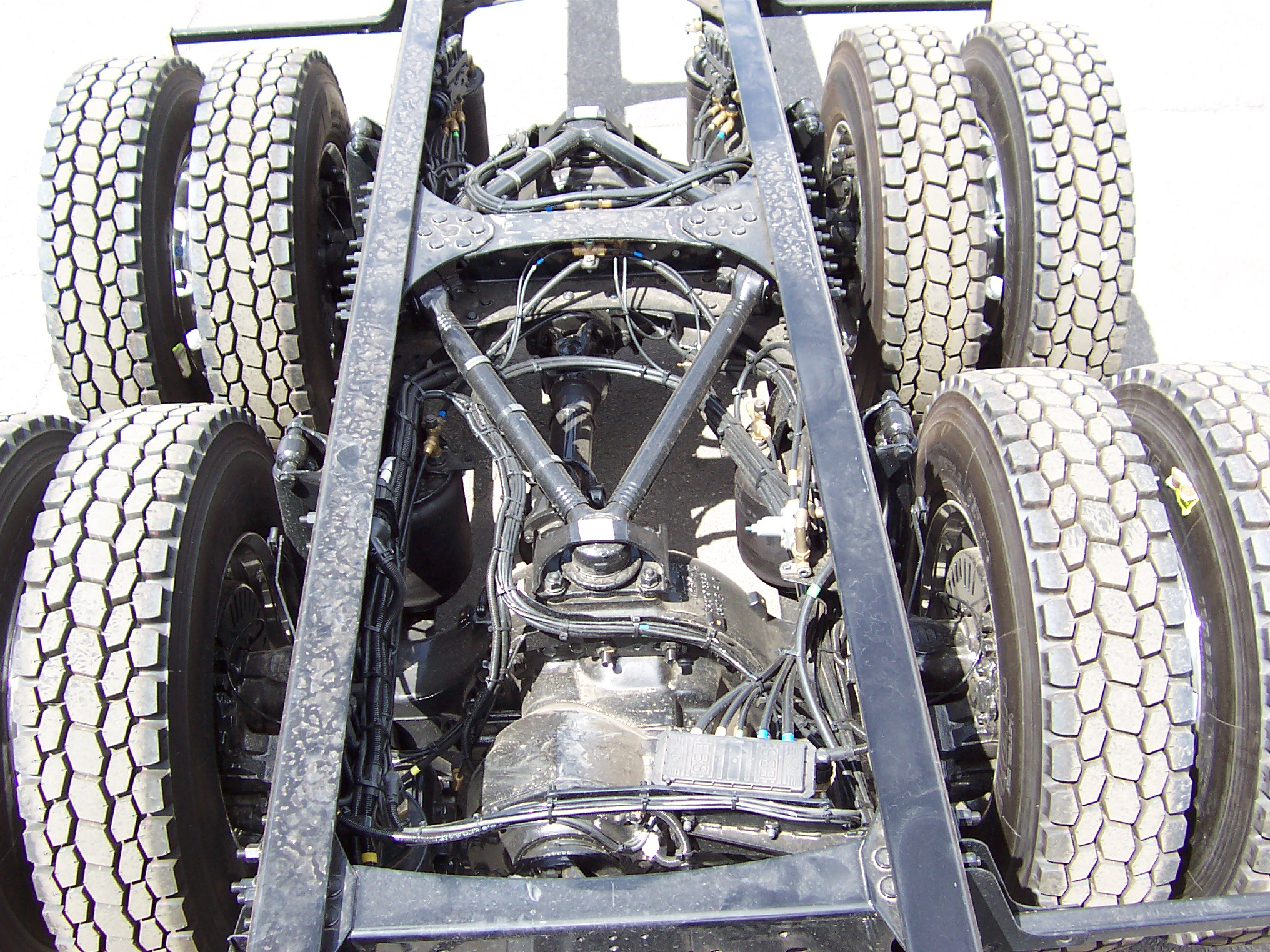
A truck rear suspension and drive axles overview

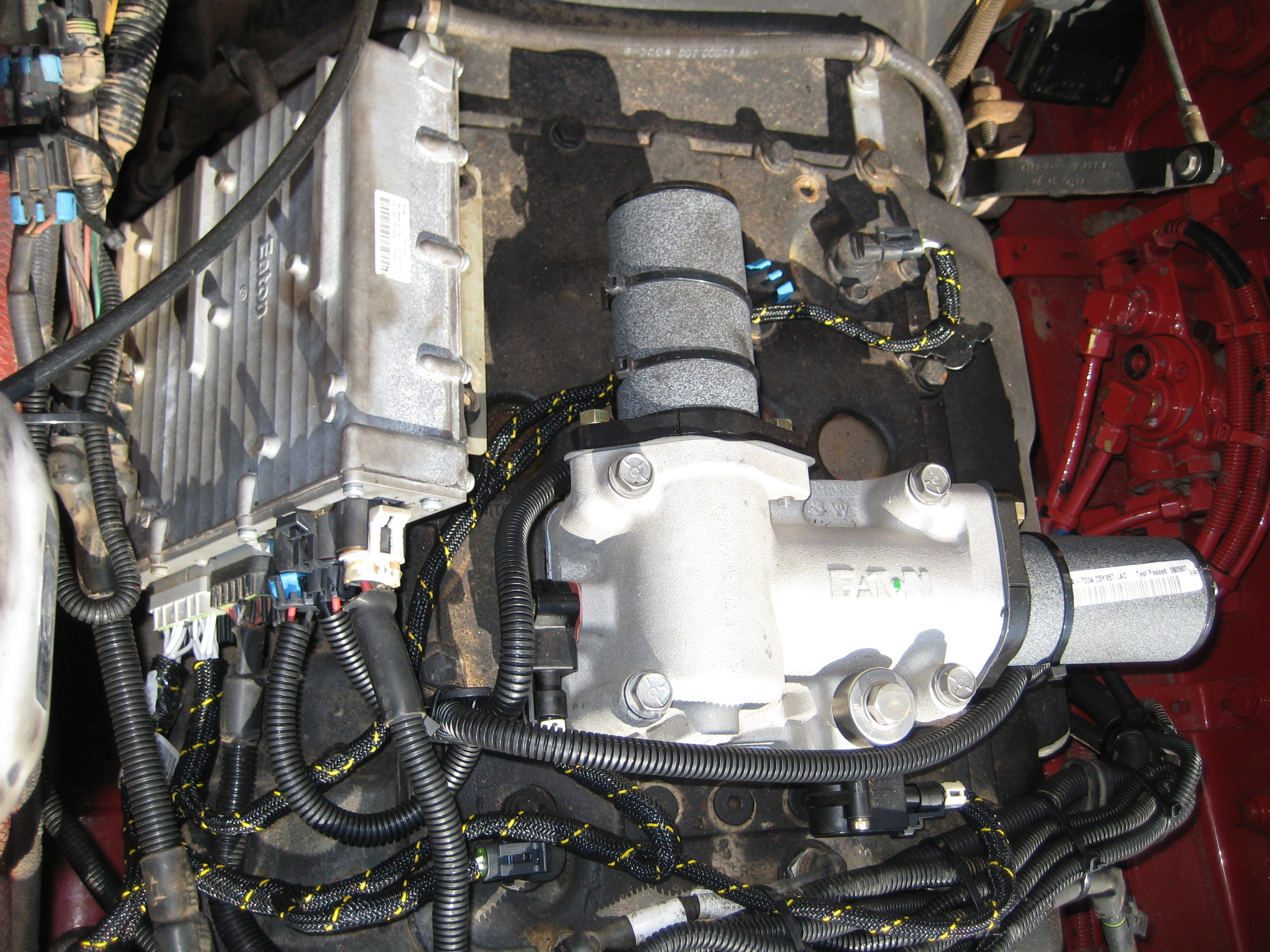
Eaton Roadranger 18 speed "crash box" with automated gearshift

Small trucks use the same type of transmissions as almost all cars, having either an automatic transmission or a manual transmission with synchromesh (synchronizers). Bigger trucks often use manual transmissions without synchronizers, saving bulk and weight, although synchromesh transmissions are used in larger trucks as well. Transmissions without synchronizers, known as "crash boxes", require double-clutching for each shift, (which can lead to repetitive motion injuries), or a technique known colloquially as "floating", a method of changing gears which does not use the clutch, except for starts and stops, due to the physical effort of double-clutching, especially with non-power-assisted clutches, faster shifts, and less clutch wear.

Double-clutching allows the driver to control the engine and transmission revolutions to synchronize so that a smooth shift can be made; for example, when upshifting, the accelerator pedal is released and the clutch pedal is depressed while the gear lever is moved into neutral, the clutch pedal is then released and quickly pushed down again while the gear lever is moved to the next higher gear. Finally, the clutch pedal is released and the accelerator pedal pushed down to obtain the required engine speed. Although this is a relatively fast movement, perhaps a second or so while the transmission is in neutral, it allows the engine speed to drop and synchronize engine and transmission revolutions relative to the road speed. Downshifting is performed in a similar fashion, except the engine speed is now required to increase (while the transmission is in neutral) just the right amount in order to achieve the synchronization for a smooth, non-collision gear change. "Skip changing" is also widely used; in principle, the operation is the same as double-clutching, but it requires neutral be held slightly longer than a single-gear change.

Common North American setups include 9, 10, 13, 15, and 18 speeds. Automatic and automated manual transmissions for heavy trucks are becoming more and more common, due to advances both in transmission and engine power. In Europe, 8, 10, 12, and 16 gears are common on larger trucks with a manual transmission, while conventional automatic or automated manual transmissions would have anything from 5 to 12 gears. Almost all heavy truck transmissions are of the "range and split" (double H shift pattern) type, where range change and so‑called half gears or splits are air operated and always preselected before the main gear selection.

=== Frame ===
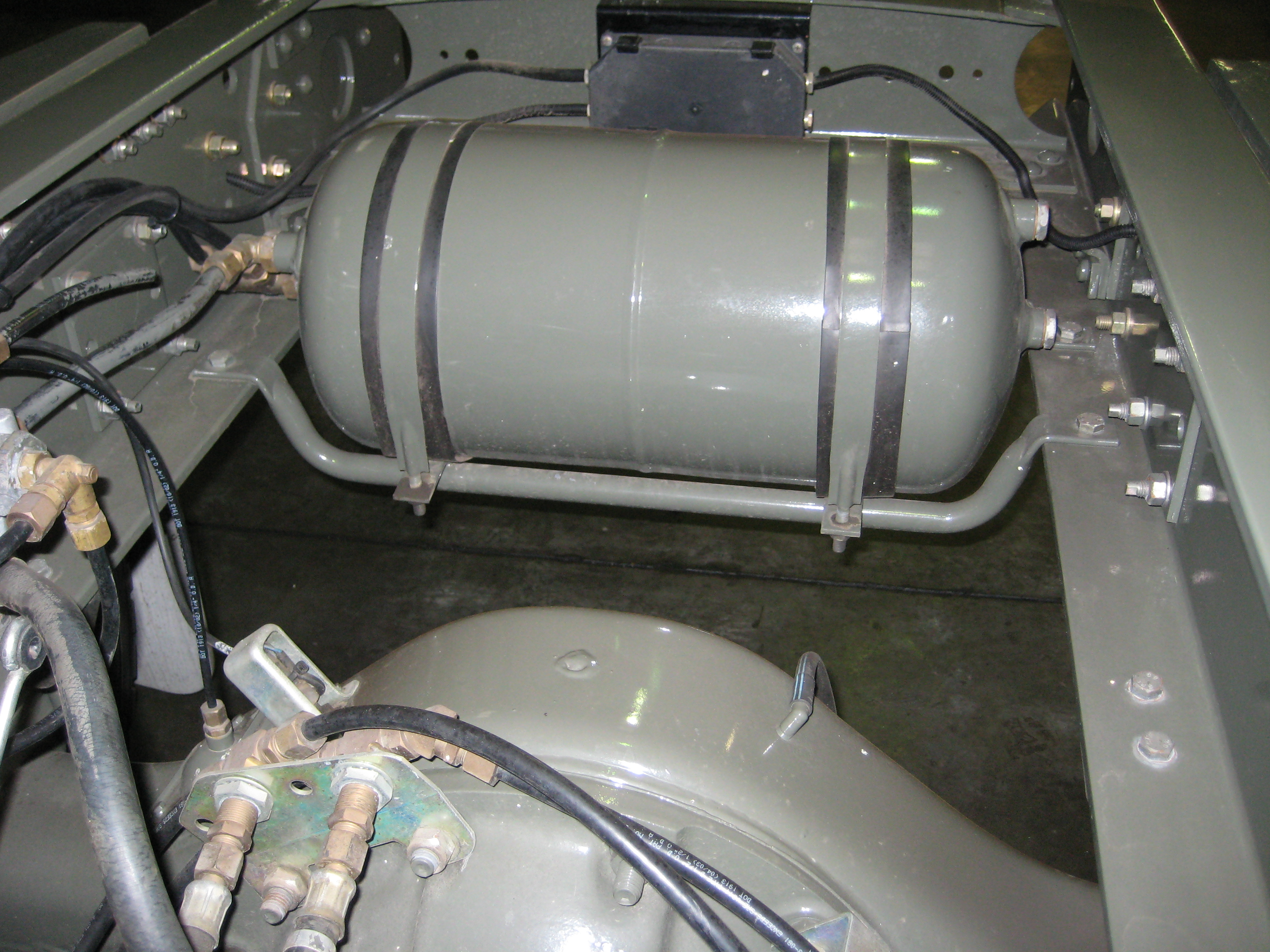
A truck rear frame (chassis) section view

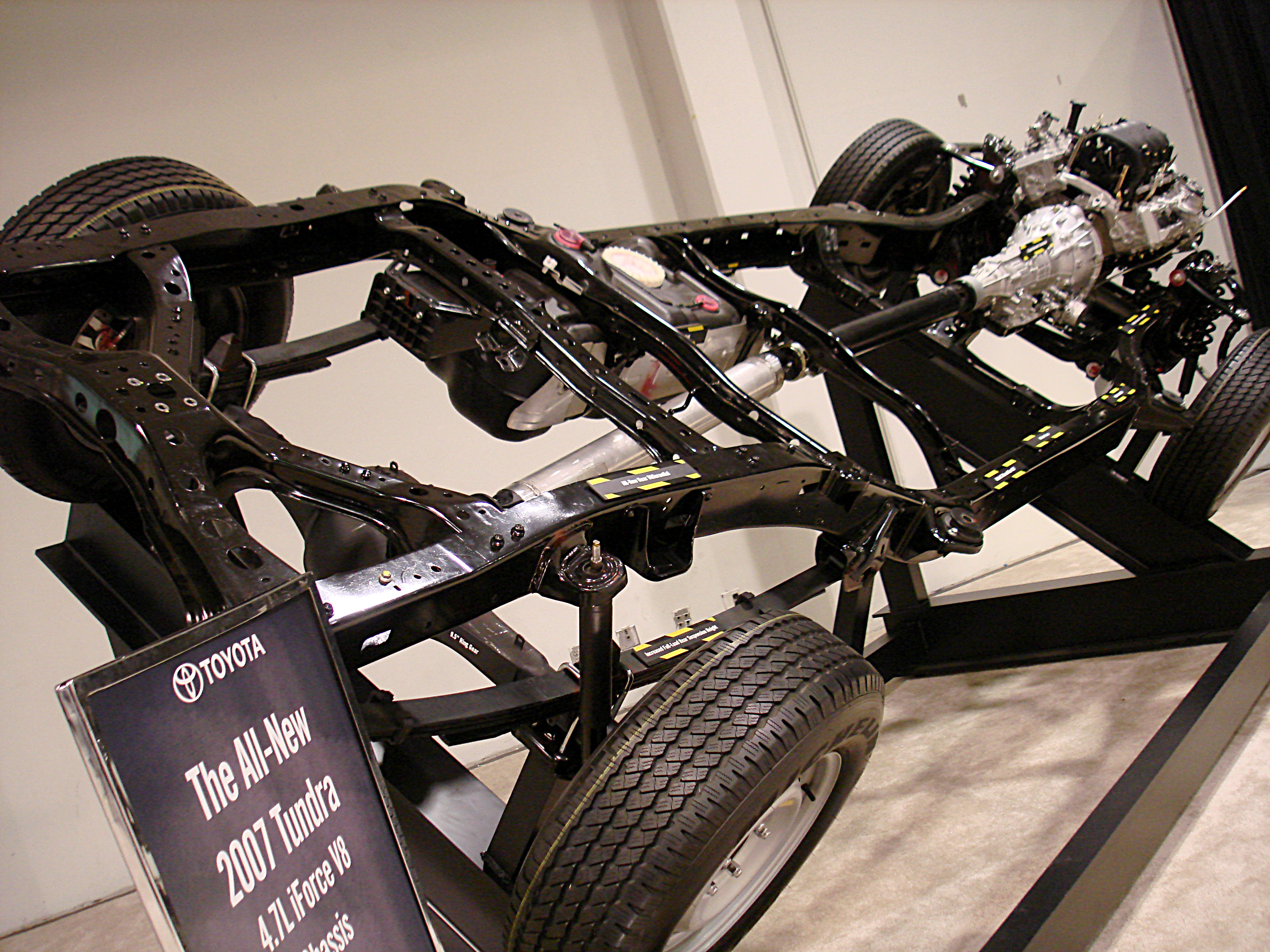
Pickup truck frame (right rear view)

A truck frame consists of two parallel boxed (tubular) or C‑shaped rails, or beams, held together by crossmembers. These frames are referred to as ladder frames due to their resemblance to a ladder if tipped on end. The rails consist of a tall vertical section (two if boxed) and two shorter horizontal flanges. The height of the vertical section provides opposition to vertical flex when weight is applied to the top of the frame (beam resistance). Though typically flat the whole length on heavy-duty trucks, the rails may sometimes be tapered or arched for clearance around the engine or over the axles. The holes in rails are used either for mounting vehicle components and running wires and hoses or measuring and adjusting the orientation of the rails at the factory or repair shop.

The frame is usually made of steel, but can be made (whole or in part) of aluminum for a lighter weight. A tow bar may be found attached at one or both ends, but heavy tractors almost always make use of a fifth wheel hitch.

=== Body types ===
Box trucks have walls and a roof, making an enclosed load space. The rear has doors for unloading; a side door is sometimes fitted.

Chassis cab trucks have a fully enclosed cab at the front, with bare chassis frame-rails behind, suitable for subsequent permanent attachment of a specialized payload, like a fire-truck or ambulance body.

Concrete mixers have a rotating drum on an inclined axis, rotating in one direction to mix, and in the other to discharge the concrete down chutes. Because of the weight and power requirements of the drum body and rough construction sites, mixers have to be very heavy duty.

Dual drive/Steer trucks are vehicles used to steer the rear of trailers.

Dump trucks ("tippers" in the UK) transport loose material such as sand, gravel, or dirt for construction. A typical dump truck has an open-box bed, which is hinged at the rear and lifts at the front, allowing the material in the bed to be unloaded ("dumped") on the ground behind the truck.

Flatbed trucks have an entirely flat, level platform body. This allows for quick and easy loading but has no protection for the load. Hanging or removable sides are sometimes fitted, often in the form of a stakebody.

Refrigerator trucks have insulated panels as walls and a roof and floor, used for transporting fresh and frozen cargo such as ice cream, food, vegetables, and prescription drugs. They are mostly equipped with double-wing rear doors, but a side door is sometimes fitted.

Refuse trucks have a specialized body for collecting and, often, compacting trash collected from municipal, commercial, and industrial sites. This application has the widest use of the cab-over configuration in North America, to provide better maneuverability in tight situations. They are also among the most severe-duty and highest GVWR trucks on public roads.

Semi-tractors ("artics" in the UK) have a fifth wheel for towing a semi-trailer instead of a body.

Tank trucks ("tankers" in the UK) are designed to carry liquids or gases. They usually have a cylindrical tank lying horizontally on the chassis. Many variants exist due to the wide variety of liquids and gases that can be transported.

Wreckers ("recovery lorries" in the UK) are used to recover and/or tow disabled vehicles. They are normally equipped with a boom with a cable; wheel/chassis lifts are becoming common on newer trucks.

== Sales and sales issues ==
=== Truck market worldwide ===
Largest truck manufacturers in the world as of 2015.
Pos.	Make	Units
1	Daimler Trucks (Mercedes-Benz, Freightliner, Unimog, Western Star, Fuso, BharatBenz)	506,663
2	Navistar International	359,000
3	Dongfeng	336,869
4	Tata	317,780
5	Volvo Group (Volvo, Mack, Renault, UD Nissan)	207,475
6	Traton (MAN, Scania, Caminhões e Ônibus)	179,035
7	Hino	162,870
8	Paccar (DAF, Kenworth, Peterbilt, Leyland)	154,700
9	Iveco	140,200

== Driving ==
In many countries, driving a truck requires a special driving license. The requirements and limitations vary with each different jurisdiction.

=== Australia ===
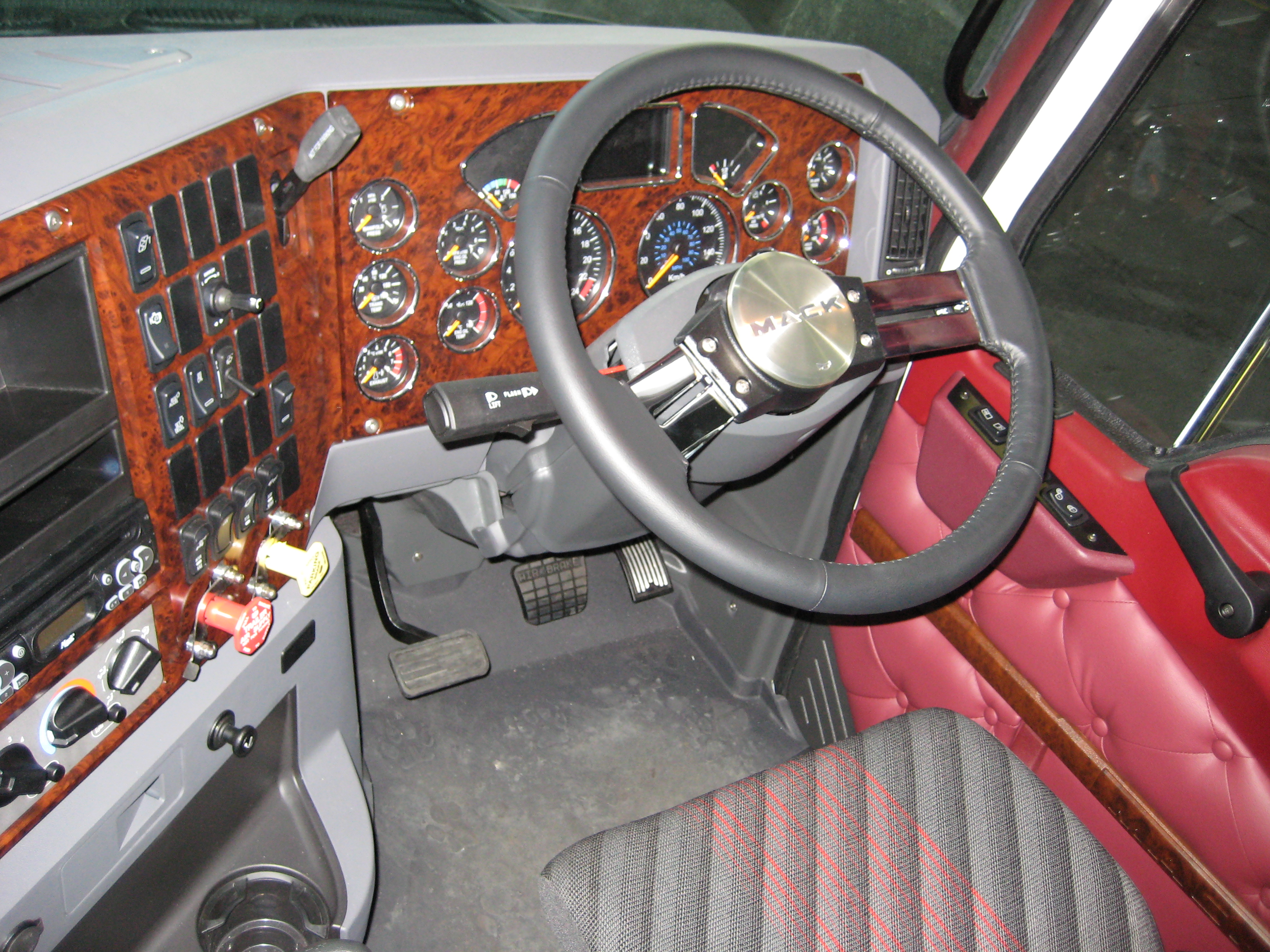
Inside a Mack truck

In Australia, a truck driver's license is required for any motor vehicle with a gross vehicle mass (GVM) exceeding 4.5 t (4.4 long tons; 5.0 short tons). The motor vehicles classes are further expanded as:

Combination

- HC: Heavy Combination, a typical prime mover plus semi-trailer combination.
- MC: Multi Combination, e.g., B Doubles/road trains

Rigid

- LR: Light rigid: a rigid vehicle with a GVM of more than 4.5 t (4.4 long tons; 5.0 short tons) but not more than 8 t (7.9 long tons; 8.8 short tons). Any towed trailer must not weigh more than 9 t (8.9 long tons; 9.9 short tons) GVM.
- MR: Medium rigid: a rigid vehicle with 2 axles and a GVM of more than 8 t (7.9 long tons; 8.8 short tons). Any towed trailer must not weigh more than 9 t (8.9 long tons; 9.9 short tons) GVM. Also includes vehicles in class LR.
- HR: Heavy Rigid: a rigid vehicle with three or more axles and a GVM of more than 8 t (7.9 long tons; 8.8 short tons). Any towed trailer must not weigh more than 9 t (8.9 long tons; 9.9 short tons) GVM. Also includes articulated buses and vehicles in class MR.

Heavy vehicle transmission

There is also a heavy vehicle transmission condition for a license class HC, HR, or MC test passed in a vehicle fitted with an automatic or synchromesh transmission; a driver's license will be restricted to vehicles of that class fitted with a synchromesh or automatic transmission. To have the condition removed, a person needs to pass a practical driving test in a vehicle with non-synchromesh transmission (constant mesh or crash box).

=== Europe ===
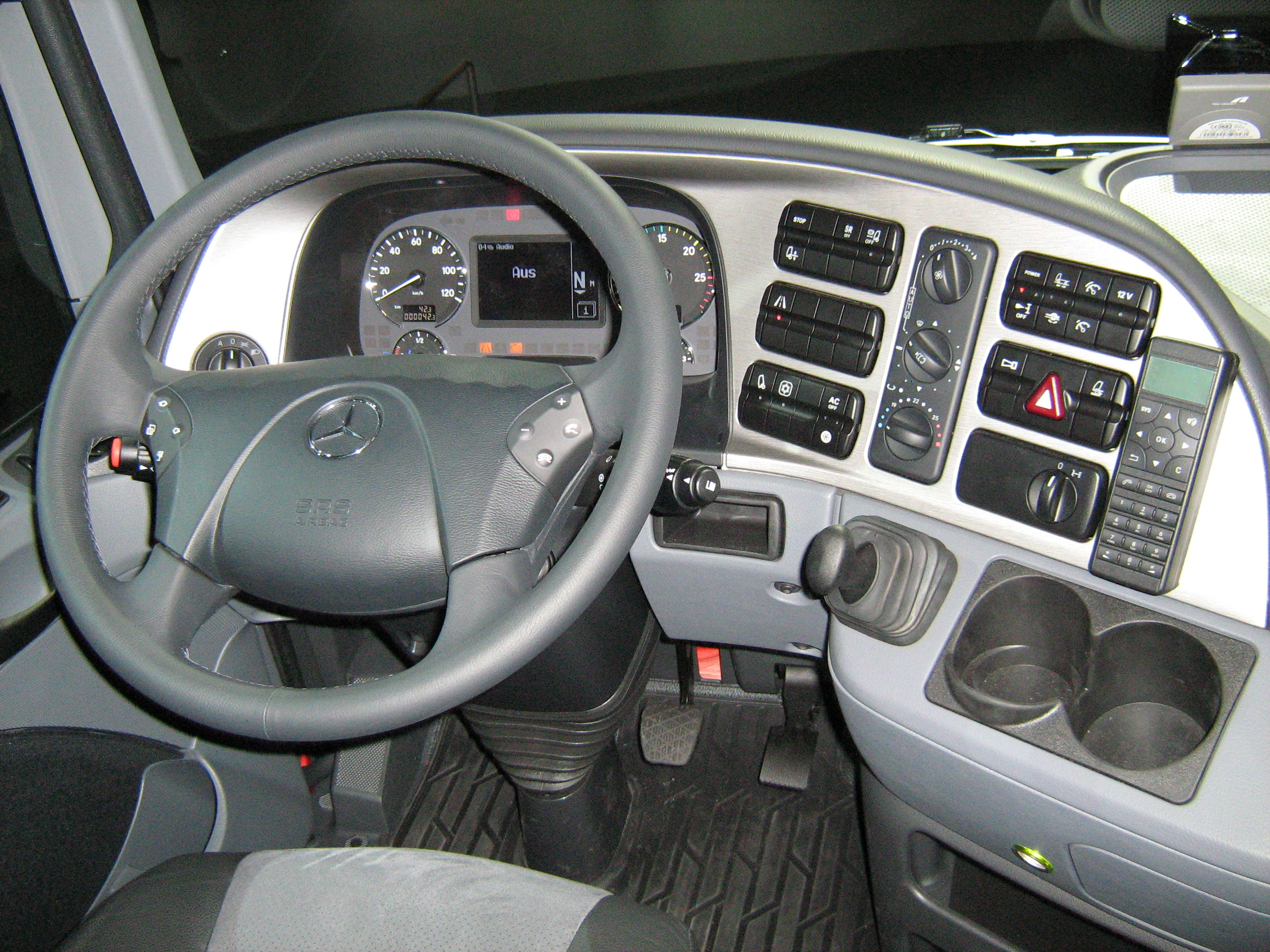
Inside a Mercedes-Benz truck

Driving licensing has been harmonized throughout the European Union and the EEA (and practically all European non-member states), so that common rules apply within Europe (see European driving licence). As an overview, to drive a vehicle weighing more than 7.5 t (7.4 long tons; 8.3 short tons) for commercial purposes requires a specialist license (the type varies depending on the use of the vehicle and number of seats). For licenses first acquired after 1997, that weight was reduced to 3.5 t (3.4 long tons; 3.9 short tons), not including trailers.

Since 2013, the C1 license category allows driving vehicles over 3.5 and up to 7.5 tonnes. The C license category allows driving vehicles over 3.5 tonnes with a trailer up to 750 kg, and the CE category allows driving category C vehicles with a trailer over 750 kg.

=== South Africa ===
To drive any vehicle with a GVM exceeding 3.5 t (3.4 long tons; 3.9 short tons), a code C1 drivers license is required. Furthermore, if the vehicle exceeds 16 t (15.7 long tons; 17.6 short tons) a code C license becomes necessary.

To drive any vehicle in South Africa towing a trailer with a GVM more than 7.5 t (7.4 long tons; 8.3 short tons), further restrictions apply and the driver must possess a license suitable for the GVM of the total combination as well as an articulated endorsement. This is indicated with the letter "E" prefixing the license code.

In addition, any vehicle designed to carry goods or passengers may only be driven by a driver possessing a Public Driver's Permit, (or PrDP) of the applicable type. This is an additional license that is added to the DL card of the operator and subject to annual renewal unlike the five-year renewal period of a normal license.

The requirements for obtaining the different classes are below.

- "G": Required for the transport of general goods, requires a criminal record check and a fee on issuing and renewal.
- "P": Required for the transport of paying passengers, requires a more stringent criminal record check, additionally the driver must be over the age of 21 at time of issue. A G class PrDP will be issued at the same time.
- "D": Required for the transport of dangerous materials, requires all of the same checks as class P., and in addition the driver must be over 25 at time of issue.

=== United States ===
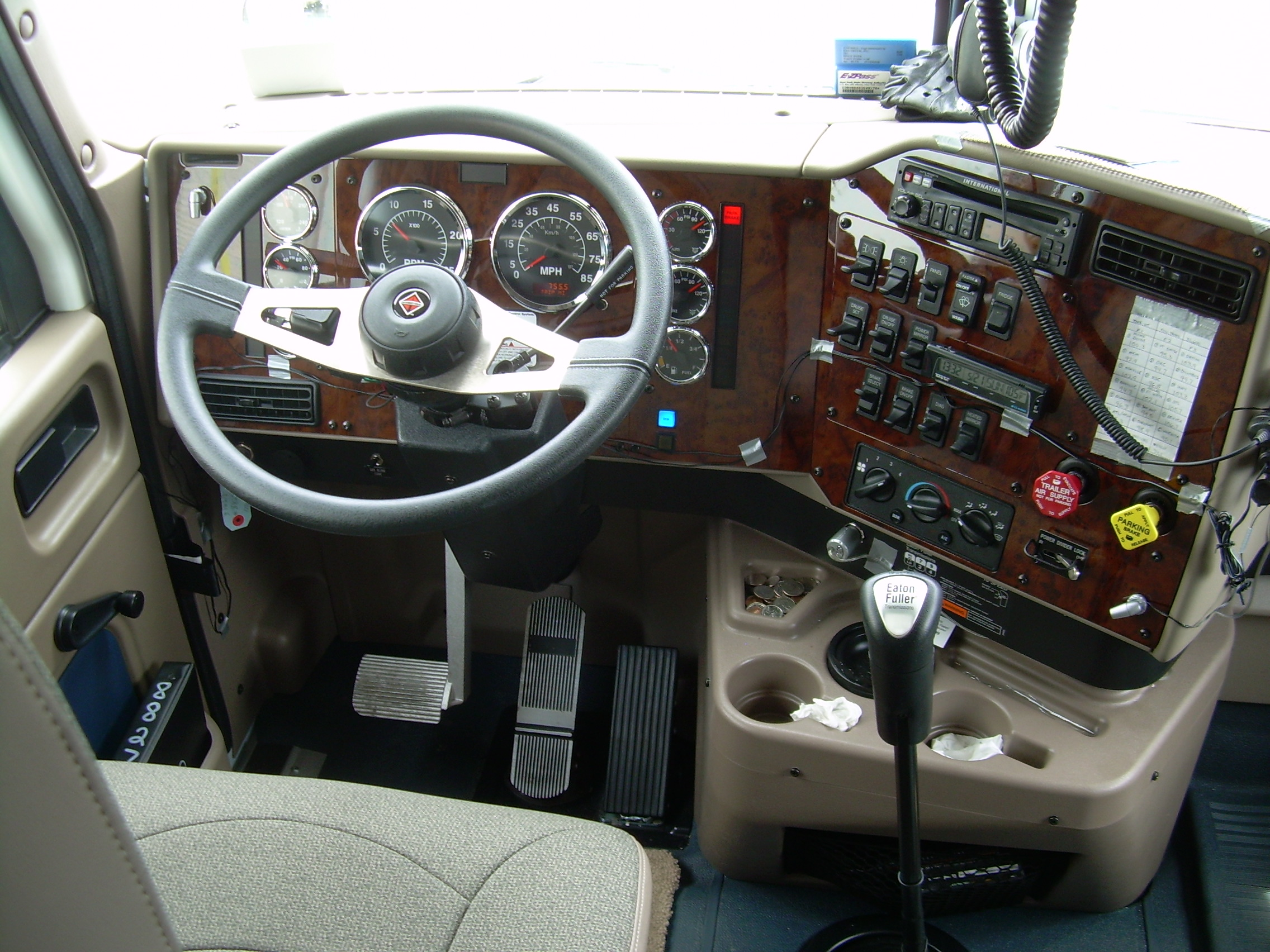
Inside a Navistar 9000

In the United States, a commercial driver's license is required to drive any type of commercial vehicle weighing 26,001 lb (11,794 kg) or more. The federal government regulates how many hours a driver may be on the clock, how much rest and sleep time is required (e.g., 11 hours driving/14 hours on-duty followed by 10 hours off, with a maximum of 70 hours/8 days or 60 hours/7 days, 34 hours restart ) Violations are often subject to significant penalties. Instruments to track each driver's hours must sometimes be fitted. In 2006, the US trucking industry employed 1.8 million drivers of heavy trucks.

There is a shortage of willing trained long-distance truck drivers. Part of the reason for this is the economic fallout from deregulation of the trucking industry. Michael H. Belzer, associate professor, in the economics department at Wayne State University and co-author of Sweatshops on Wheels: Winners and Losers in Trucking Deregulation, argues that low pay, bad working conditions and unsafe conditions have been a direct result of deregulation. The book cites poor working conditions and an unfair pay system as responsible for high annual employee turnover in the industry.

In 2018, in the US, 5,096 large trucks and buses were involved in fatal crashes:

- The number of large trucks involved in fatal crashes is 4,862,
- The number of large trucks involved in injury crashes is 112,000,
- The number of large trucks involved in property damage only crashes is 414,000.

== Environmental effects ==
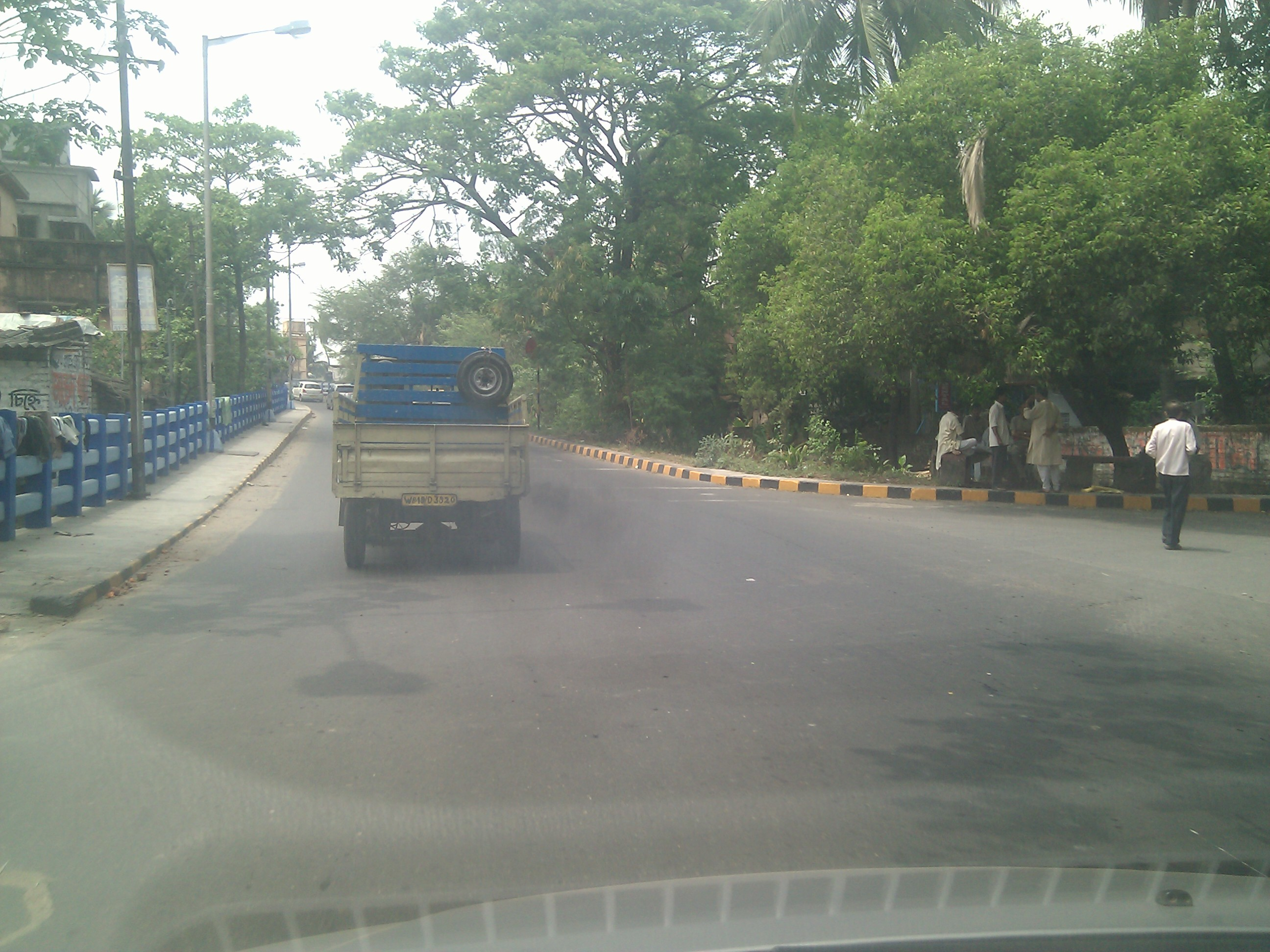
Exhaust fumes from a small truck

Trucks' share of US vehicles produced, has tripled since 1975. Though vehicle fuel efficiency has increased within each category, the overall trend toward trucks has offset some of the benefits of greater fuel economy and reductions in pollution and carbon dioxide emissions. Without the shift towards SUVs, energy use per unit distance could have fallen 30% more than it did from 2010 to 2022.

Like cars, trucks contribute to air, noise, and water pollution. Unlike cars, as of 2022, most trucks run on diesel, and diesel exhaust is especially dangerous for health. Some countries outside the EU have different vehicle emission standards for trucks and cars.

NOx and particulates emitted by trucks are very dangerous to health, causing thousands of early deaths annually in the US alone. As older trucks are usually the worst, many cities have banned 20th century trucks. Air pollution also threatens professional truck drivers.

Over a quarter of global transport CO_{2} emissions are from road freight, in 2021 over 1700 million tonnes from medium and heavy trucks, so many countries are further restricting truck CO_{2} emissions to help limit climate change. Many environmental organizations favor laws and incentives to encourage the switch from road to rail, especially in Europe. Several countries have pledged that 30% of sales of trucks and buses will be zero emission by 2030.

With respect to noise pollution, trucks emit considerably higher sound levels at all speeds compared to typical cars; this contrast is particularly strong with heavy-duty trucks. There are several aspects of truck operations that contribute to the overall sound that is emitted. Continuous sounds are those from tires rolling on the roadway and the constant hum of their diesel engines at highway speeds. Less frequent noises, but perhaps more noticeable, are things like the repeated sharp-pitched whistle of a turbocharger on acceleration, or the abrupt blare of an exhaust brake retarder when traversing a downgrade. There has been noise regulation put in place to help control where and when the use of engine braking retarders are allowed.

== Operator health and safety ==
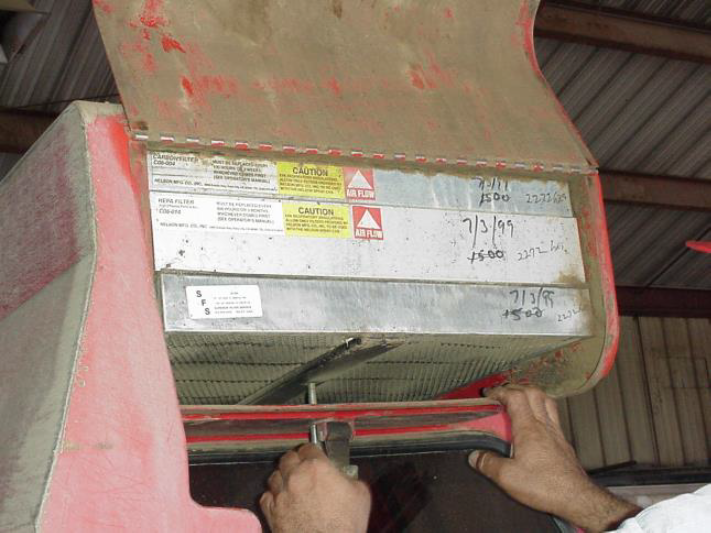
Truck cab filter housing using a contiguous series of pre-, HEPA, and charcoal panel filters

A truck cab is a hazard control that protects the truck operator from hazardous airborne pollutants. As an enclosure, it is an example of an engineering control. Enclosed operator cabs have been used on agriculture, mining, and construction vehicles for several decades. Most modern-day enclosed cabs have heating, ventilation, and air conditioning (HVAC) systems for primarily maintaining a comfortable temperature and providing breathable air for their occupants. Various levels of filtration can be incorporated into the HVAC system to remove airborne pollutants such as dusts, diesel particulate matter (DPM), and other aerosols.

Two key elements of an effective environmental enclosure are a good filtration system and an enclosure with good integrity (sealed isolation from the outside environment). It is recommended that a filtration system filter out at least 95% or greater of airborne respirable aerosols from the intake airflow, with an additional recirculation filtering component for the inside air. Good enclosure integrity is also needed to achieve positive pressure to prevent wind-driven aerosol penetration into the enclosure, as well as to minimize air leakage around the filtration system. Test methods and mathematical modeling of environmental enclosures are also beneficial for quantifying and optimizing filtration system designs, as well as maintaining optimum protection factor performance for enclosure occupants.

== Operations issues ==
=== Taxes ===
Commercial trucks in the US pay higher road use taxes on a state level than other road vehicles and are subject to extensive regulation. A few reasons commercial trucks pay higher road use taxes: they are bigger and heavier than most other vehicles, and cause more wear and tear per hour on roadways; and trucks and their drivers are on the road for more hours per day. Rules on use taxes differ among jurisdictions.

=== Damage to pavement ===
The life of a pavement is measured by the number of passes of a vehicle axle. It may be evaluated using the Load Equivalency Factor, which states that the damage by the pass of a vehicle axle is proportional to the 4th power of the weight, so a ten-ton axle consumes 10,000 times the life of the pavement as a one-ton axle. For that reason, loaded trucks cost the same as thousands of cars in pavement costs, and are subject to higher taxes and highway tolls.

== Safety ==
=== Trucking accidents ===
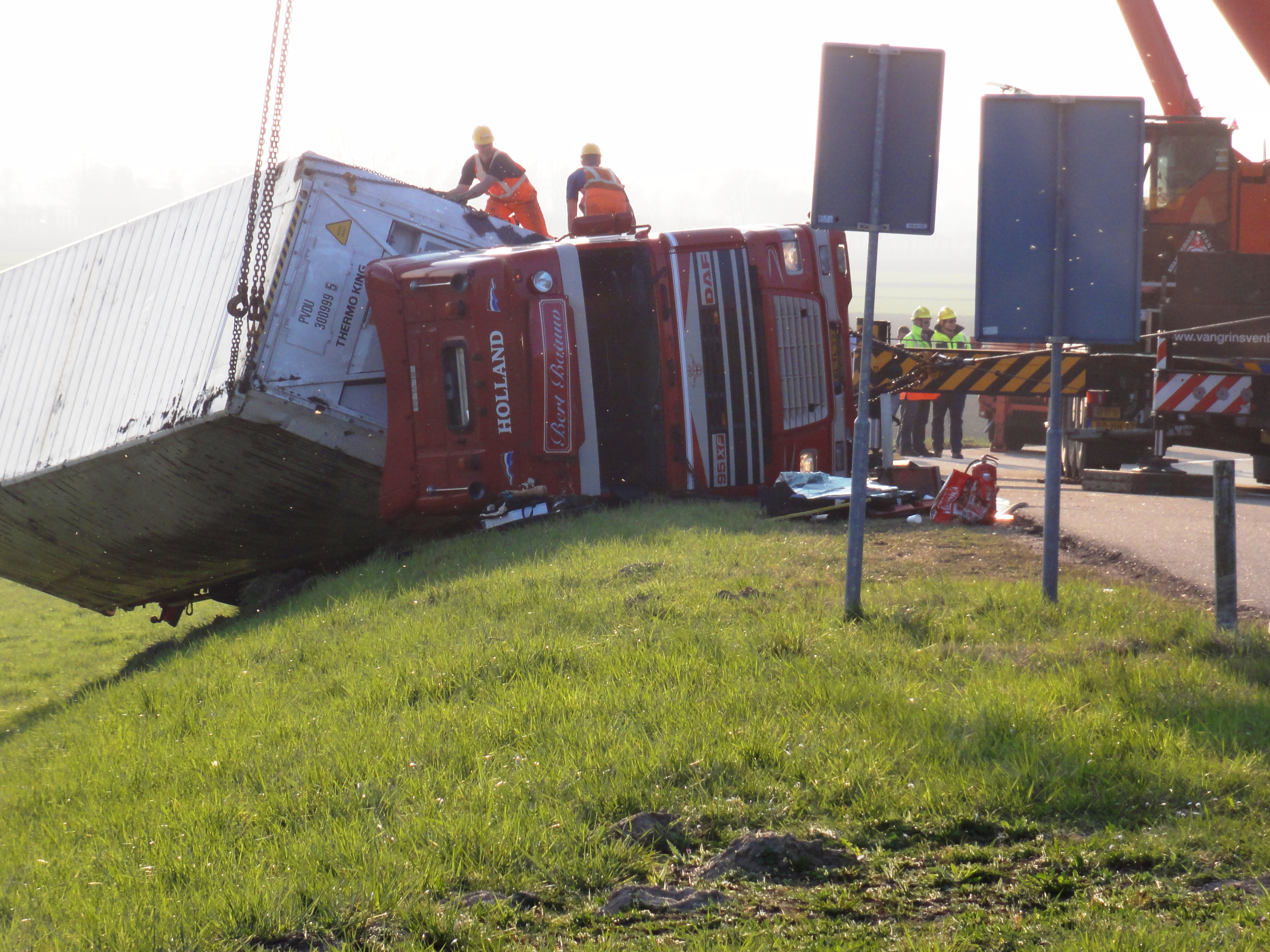
Trucking accident

In 2002 and 2004, there were over 5,000 fatalities related to trucking accidents in the United States. The trucking industry has since made significant efforts in increasing safety regulations. In 2008, the industry had successfully lowered the fatality rate to just over 4,000 deaths, but trucking accidents are still an issue that causes thousands of deaths and injuries each year. Approximately 6,000 trucking accident fatalities occur annually in the United States. Fatalities are not the only issue caused by trucking accidents. Here are some of the environmental issues that arise with trucking accidents:

- 14.4% of trucking accidents cause cargo to spill
- 6.5% cause open flames

Following increased pressure from The Times "Cities Fit For Cycling" campaign and from other media in Spring 2012, warning signs are now displayed on the backs of many heavy goods vehicles (HGV). These signs are directed against a common type of accident that occurs when the large vehicle turns left at a junction: a cyclist trying to pass on the nearside can be crushed against the HGV's wheels, especially if the driver cannot see the cyclist. The signs, such as the winning design of the InTANDEM road safety competition launched in March 2012, advocate extra care when passing a large vehicle on the nearside.

=== HGV safety in the EU ===
In-vehicle speed limitation is required applying a 90 km/h limit to commercial vehicles over 3.5 tonnes.

Front, side, and rear underrun protection is required on commercial vehicles over 3.5 tonnes.

Trucks must be fitted with blind-spot mirrors that give drivers a wider field of vision than conventional mirrors.

== See also ==
- Air brake
- Animal transporter
- Articulated hauler
- Autonomous truck
- Ballast tractor
- Campervan
- Cutaway van chassis
- Dekotora, Japanese decorated trucks
- Food truck
- Glossary of the American trucking industry
- Great West Truck Show
- Gun truck
- Hand truck
- Kei truck
- Haul truck
- Large goods vehicle
- List of military trucks
- List of pickup trucks
- List of trucks
- Logging truck
- Multi-stop truck
- Roll-off truck
- Tail lift
- Terminal tractor
- Traffic congestion
- Truck art in South Asia
- Truck classification
- Truck hijacking
- Truck scale
- Truck stop
