= Saviem SM =

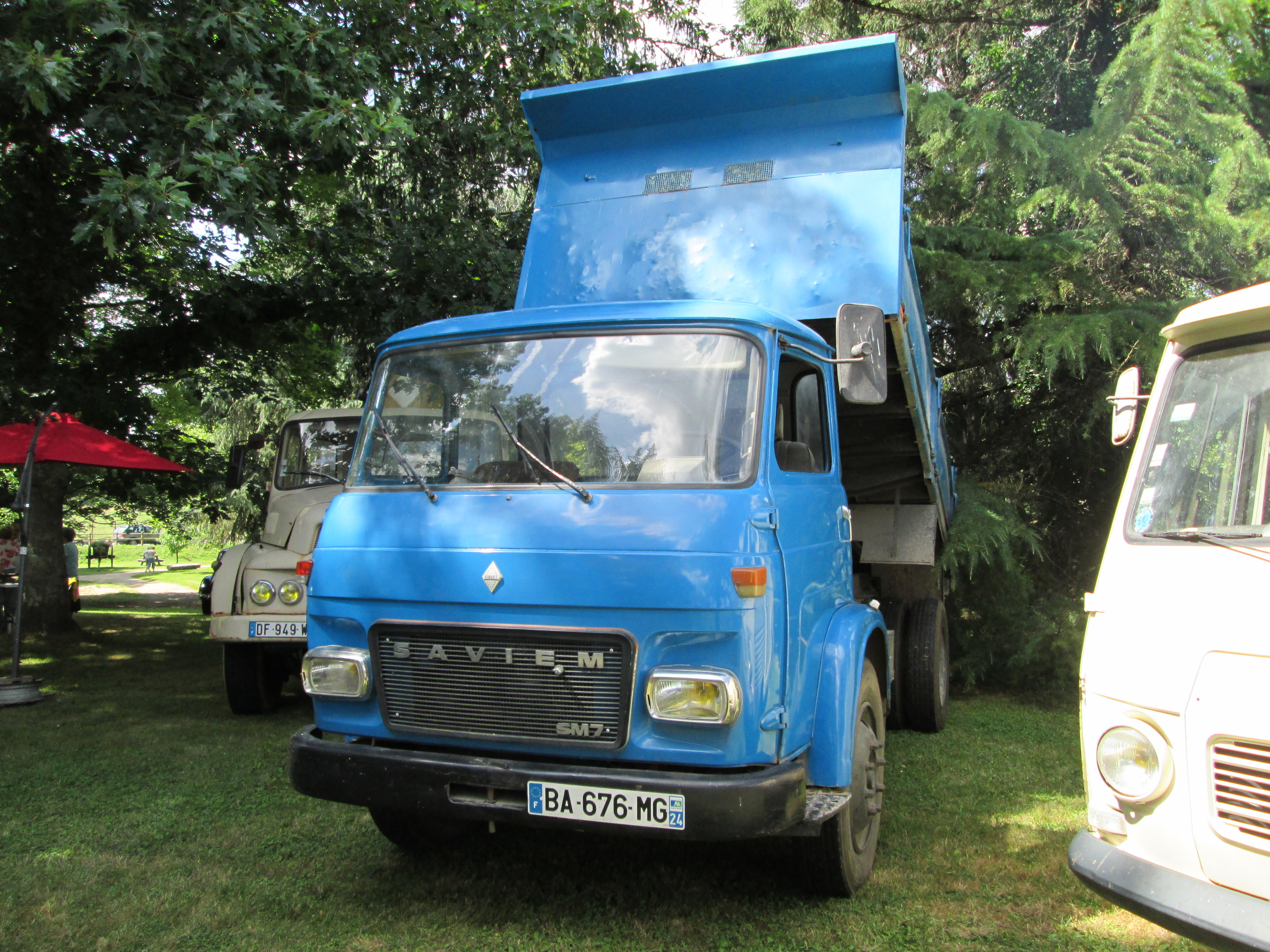
- A Saviem SM7

Overview
- Manufacturer: Saviem
- Production: 1967–1975
- Assembly: Blainville-sur-Orne, France

Body and chassis
- Class: Medium truck
- Body style: COE

Powertrain
- Engine: 3.32-litre I4; 5.27-litre I6; 5.49-litre I6; 5.49-litre I6 td
- Transmission: 5-speed manual

Chronology
- Predecessor: Saviem S
- Successor: Saviem J

The Saviem SM was a range of medium trucks produced by the French manufacturer Saviem between 1967 and 1975.

== History ==
At the end of 1967, as part of an extended partnership with the German MAN, Saviem introduced the SM (Saviem-MAN) ranges. They were made up of the namesake SM medium truck range using the 812 cab, derived from the cab used for the SG range (Super Galion and Super Goélette), and the heavier SM Europe range using the Europe/Espace cab. The commercial versions of the SM were discontinued in 1975, although versions for military use were still produced after that year.

== Technical details ==
=== Variants ===
The SM range line-up included the SM5 (8.7-tonne GVW), the SM6 (9-tonne GVW), the SM7 (10.95-tonne GVW) and the SM8 (12.3-tonne GVW).

=== Engines ===
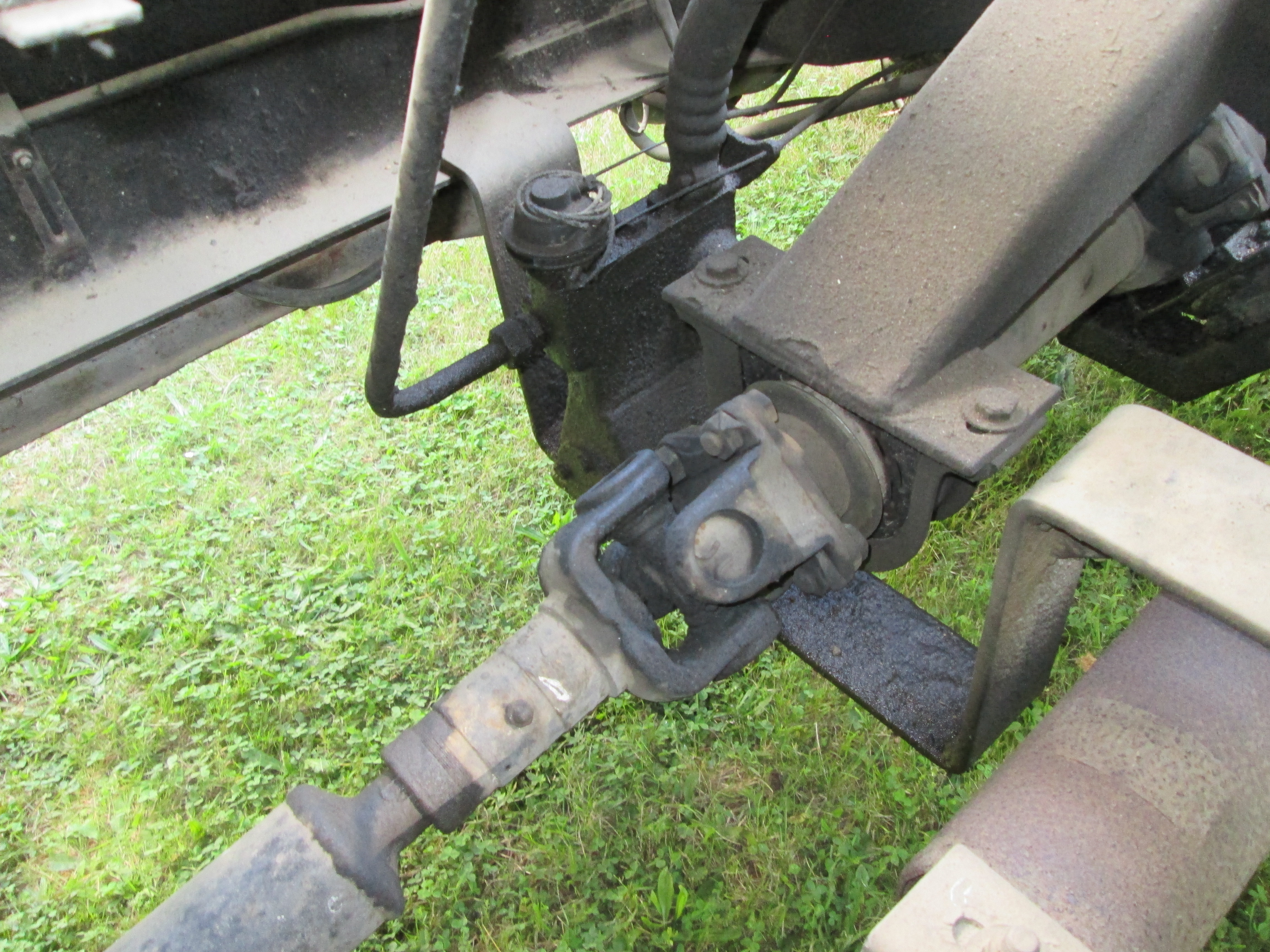
universal joint (drivetrain) on a SM7

All the SM range (except for the SM5) initially used the 597 engine manufactured at Saviem's Limoges plant, and later its evolutions: the 797 and the 798. The 597 was introduced in 1967, and it was also used for trucks of the MAN's medium range. It was a 5.27-litre naturally aspirated straight-six Diesel engine with a maximum power output of 135 PS (133 bhp; 99 kW) at 2,900 rpm and a torque of 392 N⋅m (289 lb⋅ft) at 1,600 rpm. It incorporated MAN-licensed direct injection technology and was only used on the SM6 and some military vehicles from 1970 onwards. In 1970, the SM range mounted the 797 and 798 (also called 597-05 and 598) engines, derived from the 597. The 797 (introduced in 1970) was a 5.49-litre atmospheric straight-six engine with a power output (at launch) of 145 PS (143 bhp; 107 kW) at 2,900 rpm and a torque of 402 N⋅m (296 lb⋅ft) at 1,700 rpm. The 797 was used in the SM7 and SM8 models. The 798 (used only on some versions of the Saviem SM8 4x4) was similar to the 797, but it was turbocharged and had a power output of 170 PS (170 bhp; 130 kW) at 2,900 rpm and a torque of 455 N⋅m (336 lb⋅ft) at 1,800 rpm. The SM5 used an evolution of the 712-01 engine used on the SG range.

=== Transmission ===
The transmission was a rear-wheel drive system of single shaft on the shorter chassis, and double shaft on the longer. The clutch was a manually operated single-plate Verto Division Ferodo 12 LF 39 (except for the SM8 4x4). The gearbox was an horizontally mounted 5-speed (4 synchronised) manual unit codenamed as 301.

=== Suspension and brakes ===
The suspension of the range had leaf springs on both axles. Brakes were hydraulic/air brakes (SM6) and compressed air brakes (SM7 and SM8).
