= Saviem S =

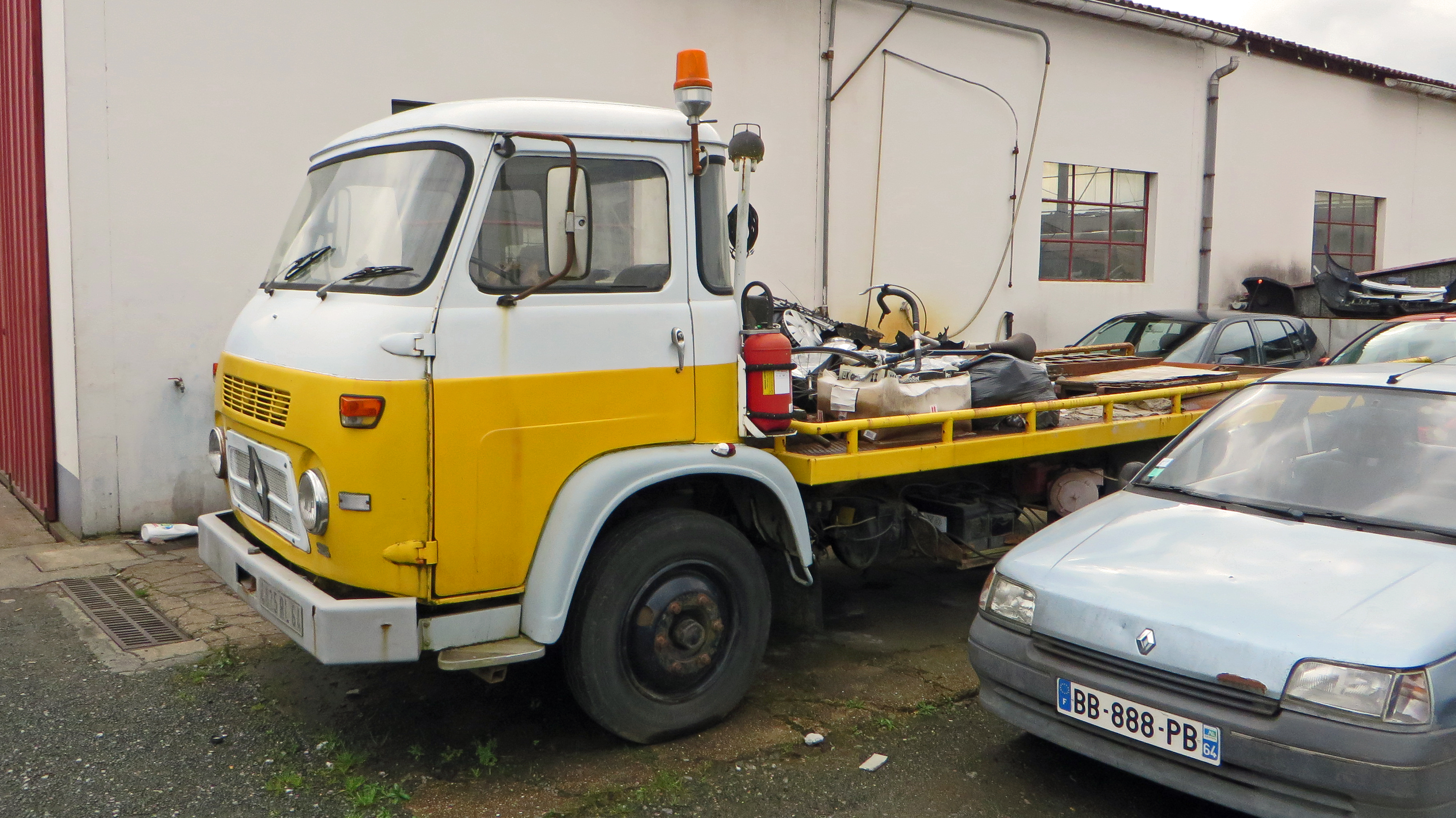
- Saviem S5

Overview
- Type: Medium-duty truck
- Manufacturer: Saviem
- Production: 1963–1967
- Assembly: Blainville-sur-Orne, France

Body and chassis
- Body style: COE
- Layout: Front-engine, rear-wheel drive

Powertrain
- Engine: diesel: 3.0 L type 591 I4; 5.8 L Perkins 6.354 I6; 6.8 L Fulgur I6
- Transmission: Manual

Chronology
- Predecessor: Saviem JL/Saviem R-series
- Successor: Saviem SM

The Saviem S is a range of medium-duty trucks manufactured by the French manufacturer Saviem between 1964 and 1967. Sold as the S5, S6, S7, S8, and S9, the number indicated the maximum cargo capacity in tonnes.

== History ==
The S range was introduced in October 1963 and originally consisted of two models using the fixed type 810 cab (a larger version of the type 710, which appeared in 1965 on the smaller SG range): the Saviem S5 (5-tonne payload) and the S7 (7-tonne payload). Later, Saviem expanded the range, unveiling two new models at the 1964 Paris Motor Show: the S8 (8-tonne payload) and the S9 (9-tonne payload). In 1966, the company introduced the S6 (6-tonne payload). The S range was gradually replaced by the SM range beginning in 1967, although evolutions of the S5 (S5B and C) and the S9 were still produced afterwards. FAR converted S trucks, the resulting models being called SD (SD5, SD8).

== Technical details ==
The S5 is powered by the 591 engine, a 3-litre four-cylinder diesel with a maximum power output of 75 PS (74 bhp; 55 kW) at 3,200 rpm and a torque of 180 N⋅m (130 lb⋅ft) at 2,000 rpm. The S6, S7 and S8 are powered by the Perkins 6.354, a 5.8-litre six-cylinder diesel with direct injection which delivered a maximum power output of 126 hp (93 kW) at 2,800 rpm and a torque of 392 N⋅m (289 lb⋅ft) at 1,600 rpm. The suspension of the four trucks have leaf springs on both axles. Brakes are hydraulic (S5) and air brakes (S7 and S8).They have a five-speed "synchromesh" manual gearbox and a gammer worm and roller steering system.

The S9, a model with a 12 to 14.9 t (26,000 to 33,000 lb) GVWR using the 840 type cab best known from the larger JL range, was added to the S5 and S7 in October 1964 (along with the S8). The S9 is powered by the F 646 Fulgur engine, a 6.8-litre six-cylinder diesel delivering 150 hp (110 kW) at 1,500 rpm and torque of 422 N⋅m (311 lb⋅ft) at 1,650 rpm. The truck has a six-speed manual gearbox with synchromesh on the top five gears. As with the other S models, the S9 has a leaf spring suspension and a gammer worm and roller steering. Its wheelbases are between 3,000 mm (120 in) and 4,600 mm (180 in).
