= Alfa Romeo A15 =

Alfa Romeo A15 / A19 / A38 / F20

Overview
- Manufacturer: Alfa Romeo
- Also called: Saviem SG2 (A15/A19); Saviem SG4 (A38); Saviem TP3 (Sinpar TP3) (A38 4x4)
- Production: 1967-1974
- Assembly: Pomigliano d'Arco, Italy

Body and chassis
- Class: Commercial vehicle
- Layout: Front-engine, rear-wheel-drive or four-wheel-drive
- Related: Avia A15/A20/A21

Powertrain
- Engine: I4 Alfa Romeo-Saviem Type 599 diesel
- Transmission: 4-speed manual

Alfa Romeo A15 / A19 / A38 / F20 are a discontinued line of utility trucks, or lorries, produced by Alfa Romeo from 1967 to 1974.

The models originated from the collaboration between Alfa Romeo and Saviem (part of the Renault group), which was signed in 1967. The collaboration began earlier when Renault and Alfa Romeo produced R4 and Dauphines in Italy.

The Lorries that were produced following this agreement were similar to Saviem SG2 (A15/A19) and SG4 (A38) models. Around 3,500 units of A15, A38, A19 and F20 were produced in the Pomigliano d'Arco plant near Naples before 1974. The Alfa Romeo naming of lorries and vans reflected the production options chosen by the customer. This comprised a letter followed by two digits: A for "Autocarro" (truck) or F for "Furgone" (van), plus a number referring to the payload (expressed in quintals, as is the usual practice in Italy).

All models are equipped exclusively with Alfa Romeo-Saviem type 559 diesel engines, producing 72 hp (54 kW) at 3,017 cc (184.1 cu in) with a MAN-licensed direct injection. Saviem did not want this engine and insisted on mounting their own diesel engine, which developed only 65 hp (48 kW), a level of power that was deemed insufficient in comparison to competing Italian vehicles. This engine was subsequently installed in French models from 1967.

== A15 ==
The A15 model had a full load of 3.5 tons and was equipped with a 4-cylinder diesel engine of 3,017 cc (184 cu in) and 72 hp (54 kW) at 3200 rpm. Four years after launch, the displacement was updated to 3,319 cc (203 cu in), which allowed the vehicle to reach a maximum speed of 92 km/h (57 mph). The A15 had a payload of up to 1,470 kg (3,241 lb).

== A19 ==
The A19 model had a full load of 3.9 tons and mounted a 4-cylinder diesel engine of 3,017 cc (184 cu in) and 72 hp (54 kW) at 3200 rpm. Four years after launch, the displacement was updated 3,319 cc. This allowed the vehicle to reach a maximum speed of 92 km/h (57 mph). The A19 had a payload of up to 1,870 kg (4,123 lb).

== A38 ==
The A38, with its 6.3 tons full load, was available with several chassis (including a shielded autotelaio and a bus chassis), which were characterized by having different steps. It was also available in an all-wheel drive variant. The A39 had a 4-cylinder diesel engine of 3,017 cc (184 cu in) by 77 hp (57 kW), which allowed the vehicle to reach a maximum speed of 79 km/h (49 mph). Four years after its initial launch, the cylinder was brought to 3,319 cc (202.5 cu in). In the standard truck version, the payload was 3,770 kg (8,311 lb). The A38 was available in several variants: a basic A38, an A38/L1 2,660 mm (104.7 in) wheelbase, and an A38/L2 3,640 mm (143.3 in) wheelbase.

In 1970 the round headlights were replaced by oval headlights. At the same time, the Alfa Romeo A38 became A38n, an advanced model.

The four-wheel drive version was developed in collaboration with the company Man Meccanica on the basis of an Alfa Romeo A19, an adaptation almost identical to that carried out in France by Sinpar TP3 (also Saviem TP3).

== F20 ==
The Alfa Romeo F20 was presented at the Turin 1967 as a prototype and produced from 1969. It was born out of a collaboration agreement between Alfa Romeo and Saviem and signed in 1967.

The F20 had a full load of 4.3 tons, a 4-cylinder diesel engine of 3,017 cc (184 cu in) and 72 hp (54 kW) at 3200 rpm; Then the displacement was brought to 3,319 cc (202.5 cu in). The F20 had a payload of 2,000 kg (4,409 lb). The F20 was offered as a paneled van with sliding side door, another with side doors on each side, and a final version without any side door. A chassis-bare version was also offered to coachbuilders for further customization.

== Production end ==
Alfa Romeo-Saviem production ended in 1974, and the Alfa Romeo vans AR40 and AR80 were not produced until 1978, when they were rebadged Iveco Daily. This was the second commercial failure. The vehicles sold poorly because they had underpowered engines for Italy's topography, and had payloads which were too low. High royalty prices far above customs duties were also a factor. Alfa Romeo abandoned this cooperation and joined forces with Fiat Veicoli Industriali in the industrial vehicle sector. Renault-Saviem reacted reasonably, and the French group sought technical cooperation with Fiat and Alfa Romeo, with whom they signed an agreement on September 13, 1974 for the creation of a joint venture (Sofim - Société Franco Italienne de Moteurs). The aim of this venture was to design and manufacture fast and powerful new-cylinder engines. The new factory was constructed in the municipality of Foggia in the south of Italy. Each manufacturer contributed 33.33% of the capital. The first engines—released in 1977—gave the factory an excellent reputation. They were named the Sofim 8140, with a displacement of 2,445 cc (149.2 cu in) developing 72 PS (71 hp) and were used in many vehicles, cars and utilities of the three brands.
