= AHX =

AHX or Ahx may refer to:

- .AHX, a module file format originating on Amiga computers
- Amakusa Airlines (ICAO:AHX), a Japanese airline
- American History X, a 1998 film
- Aminohexanoic acid (Ahx), also known as Aminocaproic acid
- Renault AHx, a range of light/medium trucks
- Vehicle registration plates of the United Kingdom § 1932 to 1963, in Middlesex, England
- A file format sister to ADX
