= Renault Colorale =

Mid-sized car produced by Renault (1950–1957)

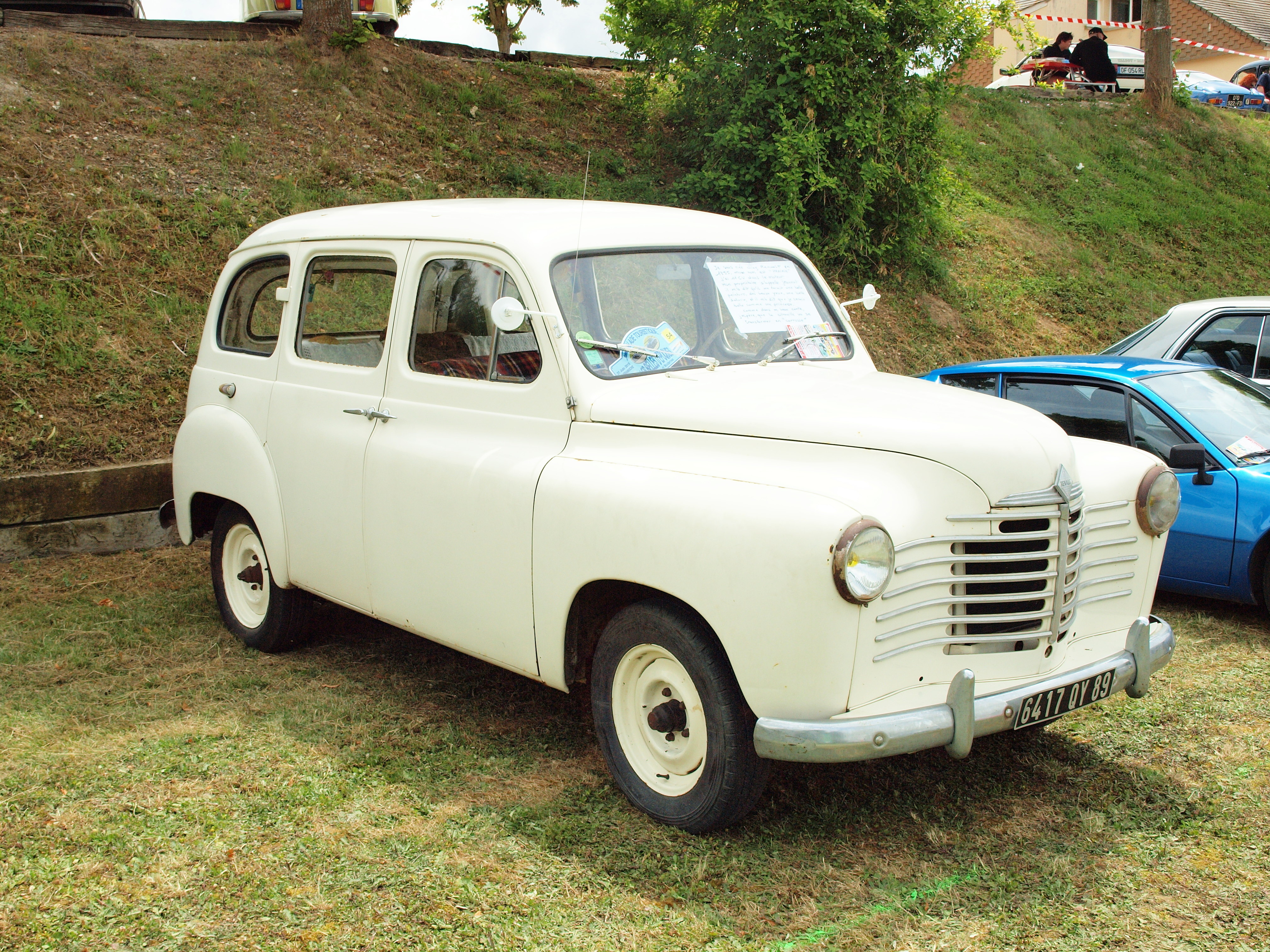

Overview
- Manufacturer: Renault
- Production: 1950–1957
- Assembly: France: Boulogne-Billancourt; France: Gennevilliers

Body and chassis
- Class: Mid-size / Large family car (D)
- Body style: 4-door station wagon 2-door station wagon 2-door panel van 2-door truck
- Layout: FR layout

Powertrain
- Engine: 2383 cc I4 , 48 hp (36 kW); 1996 cc I4, 58 hp (43 kW)
- Transmission: 3-speed manual

Dimensions
- Wheelbase: 2,680 mm (105.5 in)
- Length: 4,270 mm (168.1 in)
- Width: 1,980 mm (78.0 in)
- Height: 1,750 mm (68.9 in)
- Curb weight: 1,620 kg (3,571 lb)

Chronology
- Predecessor: Renault Primaquatre
- Successor: Renault Domaine; Renault Estafette

The Renault Colorale is a mid-size car (though by the European standards of that time it will have been seen as a large family car) manufactured and marketed by Renault from 1950 to 1957 model years. Featuring the profile of a relatively large station wagon/estate, the Colorale's styling anticipated successful Renault designs of the 1960s. The Colorale was not a commercial success.

== Background ==
Recently nationalised, and enjoying booming sales with their Renault 4CV, Renault management at the end of the 1940s sought to move their business upmarket. Company strategy called for a robust functional vehicle, equally at home in the cities or the countryside, and appealing also to overseas markets in remaining parts of the French empire. With colonial and rural customers in its sights, the car was named Colorale, a portmanteau of the (French) words ‘COLOniale’ and ‘ruRALE’.

The Renault Colorale used a modified version of the Renault 1 000 kg van chassis, while the body was completely new and Renault designers were inspired by American station wagons when developing the styling, such as the Chevrolet Suburban.

== Production ==
Body panels were stamped and assembled by the Chausson company at Gennevilliers before final assembly at the Renault Billancourt plant.

== Marketing ==
With its robust spacious body and the option of four wheel drive the Colorale was in some ways an even more radical design than the innovative and commercially more successful Renault hatchbacks that would appear in the 1960s: the Colorale in several important respects recalled the SUVs which would proliferate towards the end of the twentieth century. In the 1950s, however, the French marketplace was less welcoming to the Colorale which was slower and less elegant than other cars in this price bracket. In French overseas territories customers appear to have been less resistant to the radical new Renault, but it was nonetheless the more conventional Peugeot designs that gained a more enduring foothold in the French colonies and in the new independent states which succeeded some of them.

Approximately 43,000 Colorales had been manufactured by the time production ended in 1957. Those who wanted a large and roomy station wagon were then redirected to the Renault Domaine, which remained in production until 1960.

== Performance ==
The Colorale featured the four cylinder ’85 series’ sidevalve engine also used in the 1 000 kg van. The engine was robust, but with the compression ratios achievable using the low octane fuels available in Europe in the 1940s, the 2,383 cc engine, although it attracted a high (14CV) level of car tax, only managed a claimed power output of 48 hp (36 kW). With a weight of 1,640 kg (3,616 lb), the Colorale consumed petrol at an alarming rate and achieved its claimed top speed of 100 km/h (62 mph) only with difficulty.

The 1953 Colorale, introduced at the 1953 Paris Motor Show, featured the four cylinder engine recently developed for the Frégate. This 1,996 cc unit offered 58 hp (43 kW) and an increased maximum speed which now exceeded 105 km/h (65 mph) could now be claimed. The new engine also conferred tax advantages resulting from its smaller size which placed the car in the 11CV tax band. However, the improved power output came with reduced torque, and overall "on-road" performance continued to be viewed as leisurely.

== The versions ==
Several different versions were offered, including a light van and a small truck. The most popular versions were the five door Prairie and the three door Savane.

The Colorale Prairie was by far the best-selling Colorale. Featuring a six-light (three side windows on each side) body, it was a 4-door family car able to accommodate 6 people and offering a generous cargo area: with the rear seat folded down, the Prairie provided nearly three cubic meters of load space. Externally similar to the Prairie was a taxi version which featured a central row of rear-facing foldaway seats after the manner of a standard London taxi in the later twentieth century, but this had disappeared from the model listings by 1952.

The Colorale Savane was similar to the Prairie but had only one door each side. Blinds were included for the rear side windows in order to make the car cooler in hot climates: the opening windscreen was promoted as a device for improving the ventilation. The Savane was also favoured as an alternative to a light commercial van, particularly suited to rough roads on account of its upgraded suspension.

=== Towing truck conversions ===
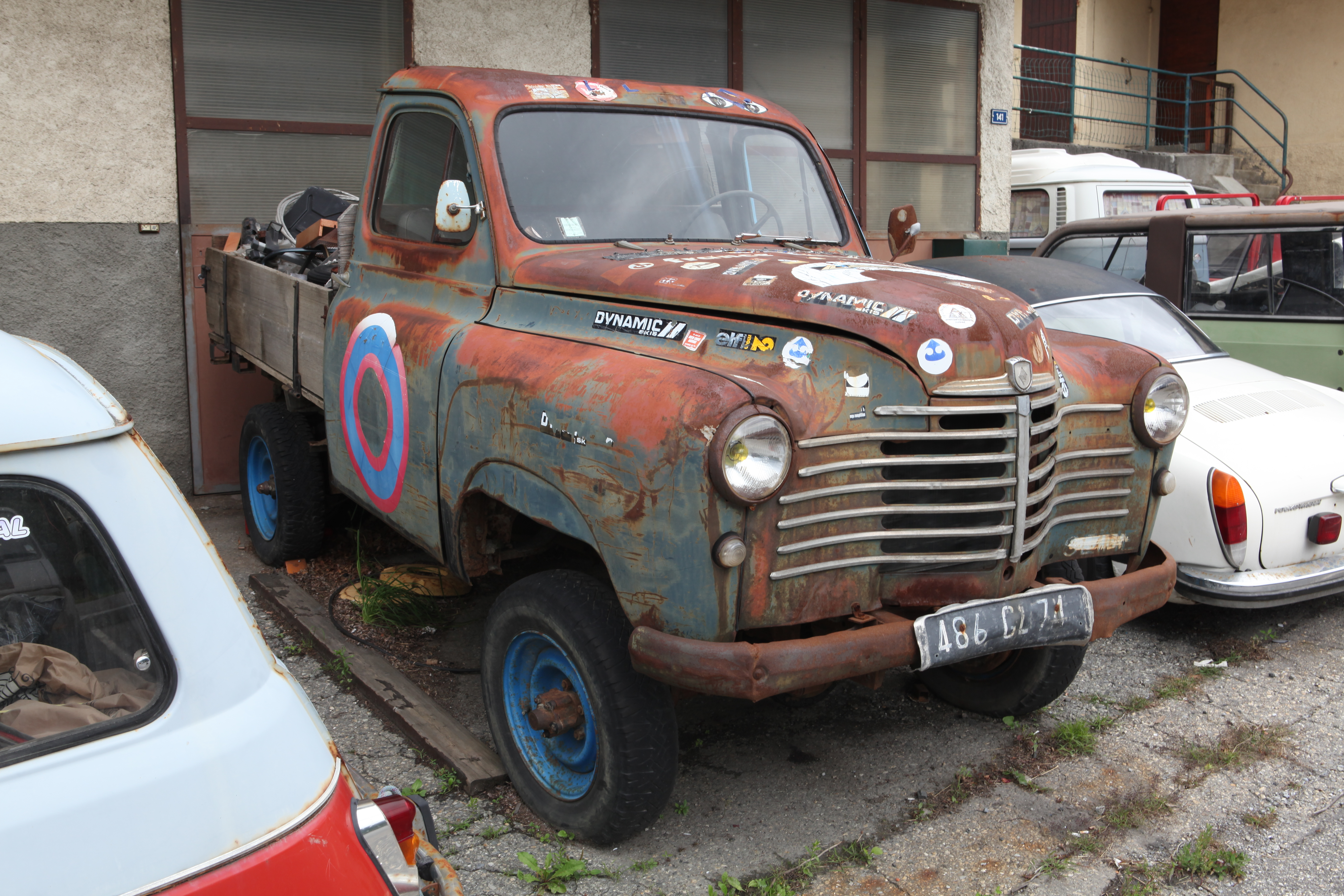
Renault Colorale chassis cab truck

The rather unloved Renault Colorale was quite cheap on the second-hand market when more appealing new vehicles were offered to the public in the early and mid sixties, and it had a sturdy chassis, 4WD transmission, and a bullet-proof and "torquey" albeit low powered engine. Such characteristics prompted Renault dealers and independent repair shops to convert second hand Colorales into "dépanneuses" (Tow trucks). Typical conversions would entail a complete chopping of the rear body, leaving only a forward cab closed with a flat panel and a small, flat, rear window from a Renault 4CV. The towing arrangement generally was some homemade craning device made out of steel H beams (sometimes even railway tracks) and a Verlinde chain hoist. Such artisanal conversions, under the then tolerant road regulations served well into the 1980s and even 1990s. Some other conversions with a similar layout were made for forestry work and trade as new, specially designed 4WD vehicles were rather scarce in France. These "Dépanneuse" conversions explain why there are very few Colorales in original condition and make them highly collectible vehicles.
