= Saviem =

French manufacturer of trucks and buses

- Type: Subsidiary
- Industry: Automotive industry
- Predecessors: Renault Poids Lourds; Somua; Latil
- Founded: 1955
- Defunct: 1978
- Fate: Merged into Renault Véhicules Industriels
- Successor: Renault Trucks
- Headquarters: Suresnes, France
- Products: Trucks, light commercial vehicles, buses/coaches
- Parent: Régie Nationale des Usines Renault

The Société Anonyme de Véhicules Industriels et d'Équipements Mécaniques (French pronunciation: [sɔsjete anɔnim də veikyl ɛ̃dystʁijɛl e dekipmɑ̃ mekanik]), commonly known by the acronym Saviem (French pronunciation: [savjɛm]), was a French manufacturer of trucks and buses/coaches part of the Renault group, headquartered in Suresnes, Île-de-France. The company was established in 1955 by merging Renault heavy vehicle operations with Somua and Latil and disappeared in 1978 when it was merged with former rival Berliet to form Renault Véhicules Industriels.

The company initially had various factories for vehicle production around France (mainly at the Paris area) which came from its predecessors and Chausson, but it soon centred assembly on Blainville-sur-Orne (trucks) and Annonay (buses and coaches). Saviem formed partnerships with other manufacturers, leading to technology-sharing agreements.

== History ==
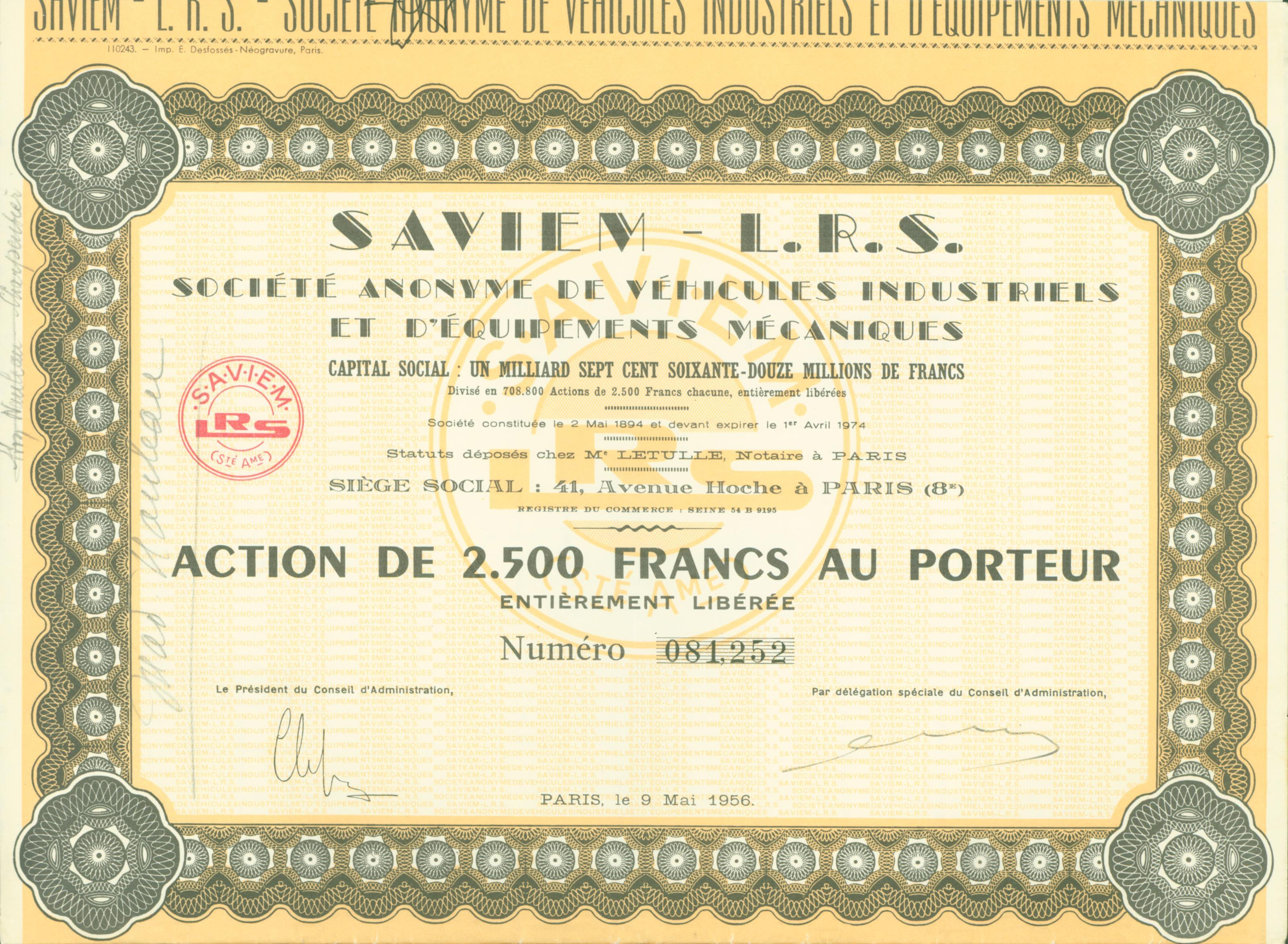
Share of Saviem-LRS, issued 9. May 1956

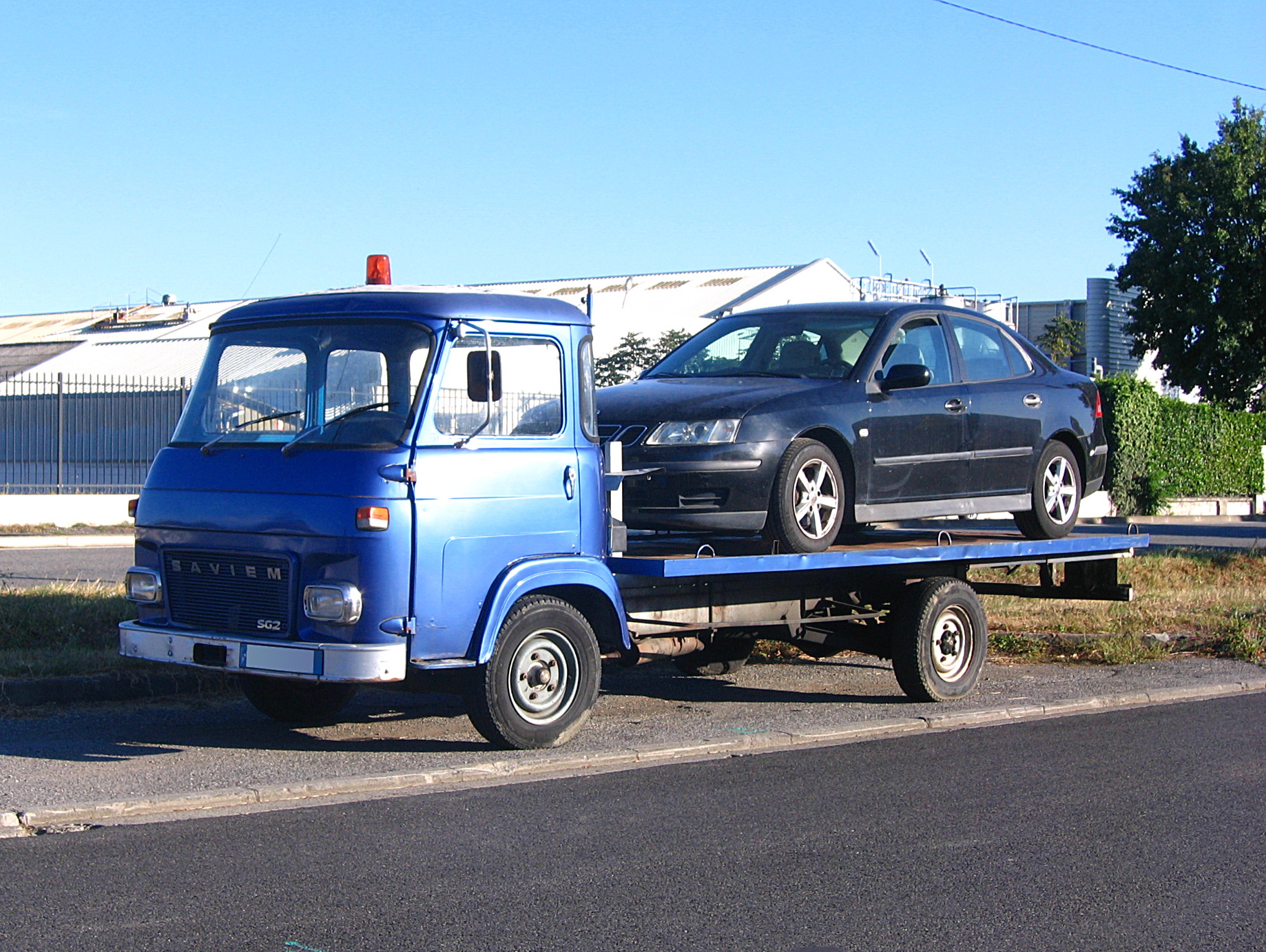
A Saviem SG2

=== Early years ===
At the end of 1946, Renault abandoned the production of heavy trucks in view of its financial troubles, and the company lost the position of France's market leader which it had before World War II. However, the rapid development and production concentration in that sector made Renault to seek ways to re-enter the market. In 1950, the Renault's technical chief, Fernand Picard, elaborated a plan to launch a limited range of trucks and buses with a single 105 CV engine, taking advantage of the economies of scale, which proved unsuccessful. In 1953, the strategy was changed and Renault decided to acquire rival manufacturers, starting with Somua and Latil. The company Saviem was formed in October 1955 by the merger of Renault's trucks and buses manufacturing operations with Somua and Latil and both Schneider (owner of Somua) and the Blum family (owners of Latil) had stakes in the new company. Initially, the Saviem name was added alongside the existing badges of the three constituting companies but, from 1957 onwards, Saviem-LRS appeared as the marque's name on the products (the acronym representing the former marques Latil, Renault and Somua), which was simplified to Saviem in 1960. In 1959, Saviem became a wholly owned subsidiary of Renault. The early product range of the company consisted of small commercial vehicles derived from Renault's existing models (Goélette and Galion), new medium and heavy trucks with Alfa Romeo engines and Chausson support for the coach/bus production. With an aggressive market approach focused on volume rather than on quality, Saviem became the leader by sales in France.

=== New vehicles and partnerships ===
During the early 1960s the company introduced a renovated JL heavy and medium duty trucks range with a revised design, new buses and coaches and, in 1964, a S range of medium duty trucks (with Renault and Perkins engines), unveiled at the Paris Motor Show. In January 1961, Saviem took control of the bus manufacturer Floirat, based at Annonay. That year, Saviem signed a cooperation agreement with Henschel-Werke. In 1962, Pierre Dreyfus decided to expand the European partnerships of Saviem and the company received a large capital amount from the French State for recapitalisation and modernisation. It also got the Limoges factory, which manufactured diesel engines. Between 1963 and 1966, Saviem moved most of its production from the Paris area to Blainville-sur-Orne and Annonay. In 1967, the Blainville-sur-Orne factory produced 26,000 large goods vehicles and the Annonay factory 1,777 buses/coaches. In 1965, Saviem acquired the French heavy equipment manufacturer Richard-Continental in a bid to compete with Caterpillar.

From 1963 to 1977, Saviem cooperated with MAN of Germany (in 1967 such cooperation was expanded). As part of the agreement, Saviem supplied cabs and in return, MAN supplied axles and engines. The result of this was the launch of the SM (Saviem-MAN) and JM truck ranges in France. Renault also introduced the Super Galion, in partnership with Avia. In 1975 Saviem, together with DAF, Volvo and Magirus-Deutz (soon after to become a part of Iveco) became co-founder of the Club of Four cooperation to produce medium-sized trucks. At the same time, Saviem signed an agreement with DAC in Romania to provide engines for their new 6135. The same year, Saviem also acquired Sinpar and completed, together with Fiat and Alfa Romeo, the construction of a joint production facility for engines (Sofim) in Foggia, Italy, at a cost of US$250 million.

In January 1968, the main Saviem factory at Blainville-sur-Orne was the setting for one of the first workers' protests that led to the French May.

=== Merger with Berliet ===
As a result of companies' reorganisation and a French State decision of unifying the heavy vehicle production in France, in 1975 Renault also acquired the truck and bus manufacturer Berliet from the Michelin group. In 1978, Berliet and Saviem were merged to form Renault Véhicules Industriels (RVI). Again, the old marque names were retained for two more years while the model lineups gradually were assimilated, and in April 1980 they were replaced by the name Renault, putting an end to the Saviem badging. In 1977, its last year as a separate company within Renault, Saviem manufactured 35,059 buses/coaches and trucks.

== Facilities ==
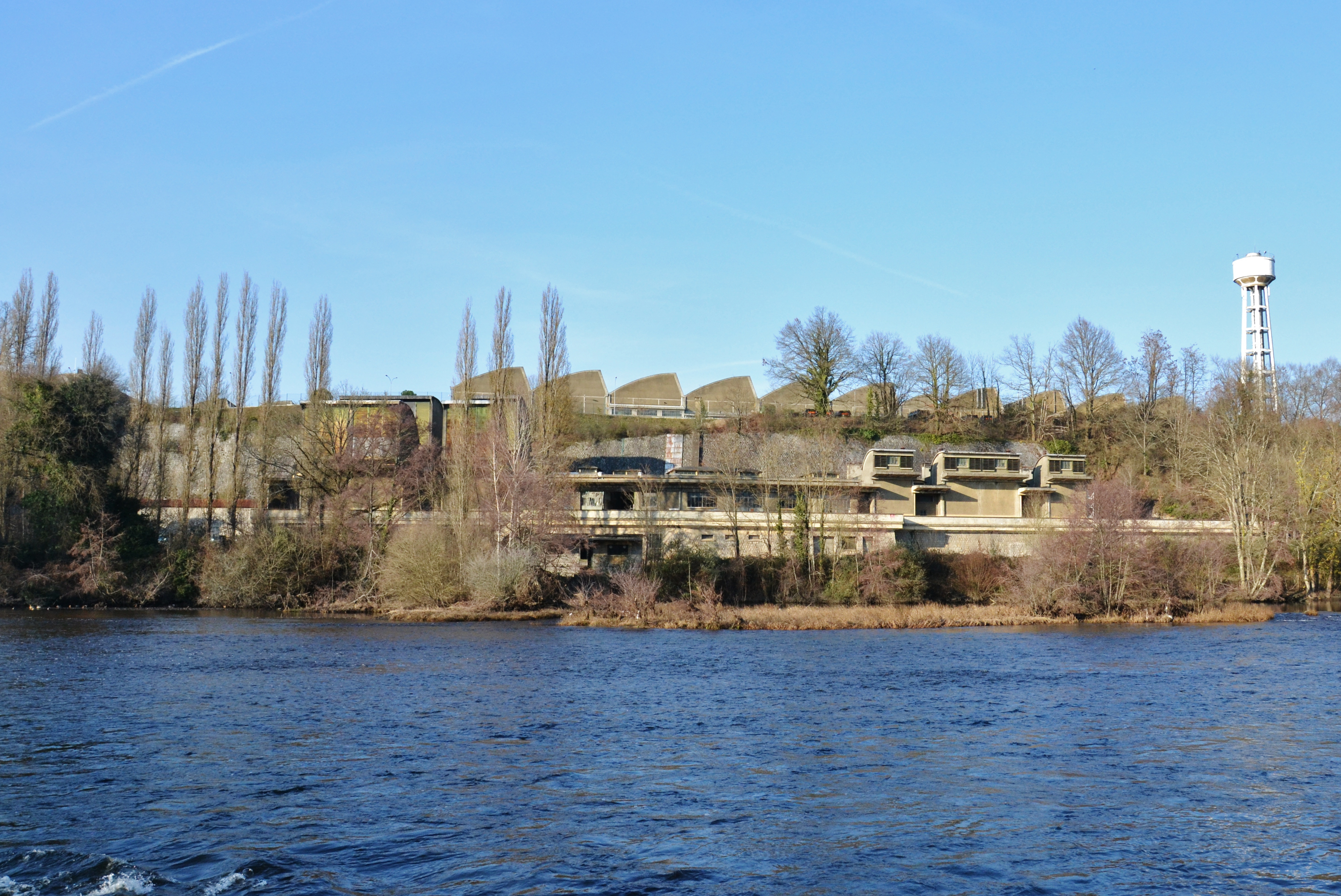
As of 2015, the Limoges factory is owned by Volvo's Renault Trucks

=== Vénissieux and Saint-Ouen ===
Vénissieux and Saint-Ouen were Somua factories. Vénissieux continued producing trucks until 1962. Saint-Ouen assembled engines until that activity was completely transferred to Limoges in 1964 and later auto parts.

=== Suresnes and Saint-Cloud ===
Suresnes and Saint-Cloud were Latil factories. Suresnes slowly ceased production but was kept as the head office and research and development base for the company.

=== Argenteuil ===
The Argenteuil factory was a former Chausson bus/coach facility operated by Saviem since 1960. It produced parts for both Saviem and Chausson.

=== Annonay ===
The coach/bus factory since 1961, originally part of Floirat and Isobloc.

=== Blainville-sur-Orne ===
Built in 1956 on the former Cahen shipyards, Blainville was the only truck factory owned by Saviem from 1966 onwards.

=== Limoges ===
In May 1964, the French government donated to Saviem the Limoges factory, a manufacturing facility for aircraft engine parts. Limoges became the main engine assembly location of the company.

=== Lyon ===
Saviem-owned Richard-Continental had two factories in Lyon.

== Models ==
=== Trucks and light commercial vehicles ===
- Saviem/Renault Galion
- Saviem/Renault Goélette
- Saviem Super Galion
- Saviem Super Goélette
- Saviem H
- Saviem J
- Saviem JL
- Saviem JM
- Saviem P
- Saviem S
- Saviem SM
- Saviem PX

=== Buses and coaches ===
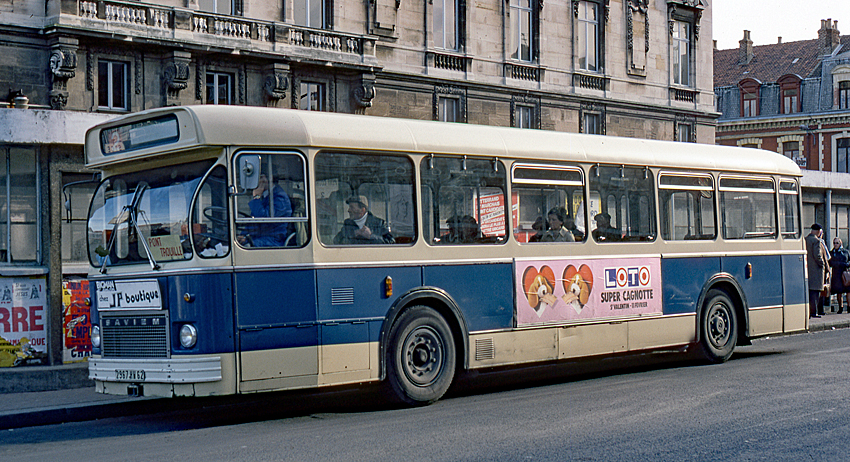
Saviem bus in Calais, 1980

- Saviem R-series
- Saviem ZR 20
- Saviem-Floirat ZF 20
- Saviem SC (Saviem-Chausson) 1/2/5
- Saviem SC10
- Saviem S45
- Saviem S53
- Saviem S105
- Saviem E5
- Saviem E7

=== Military trucks ===
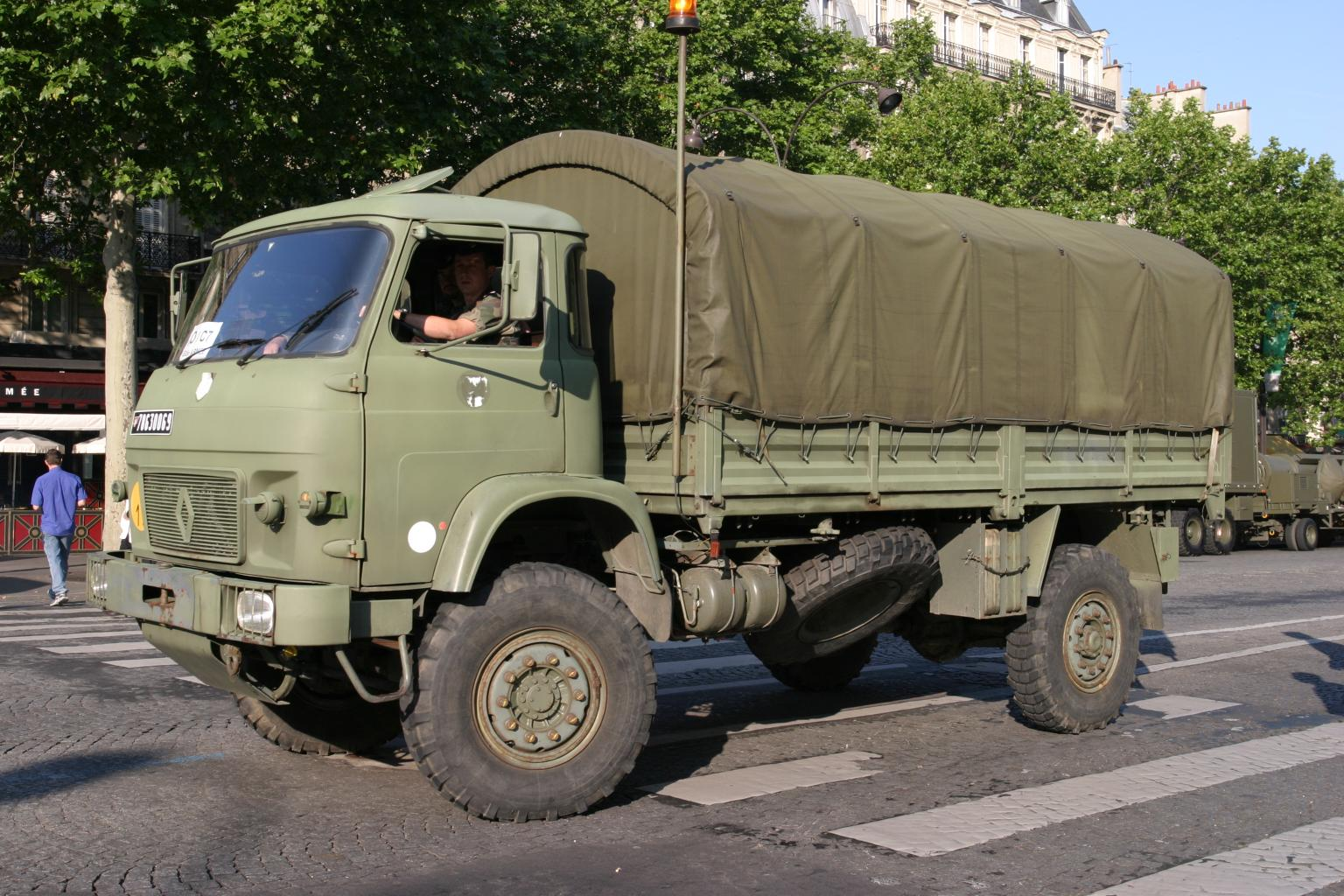
A Saviem SM8 TRM4000 military truck.

- Saviem SM8 TRM 4000

== See also ==
- Croisière des Sables Expeditions
- Berliet
