= Saviem H =

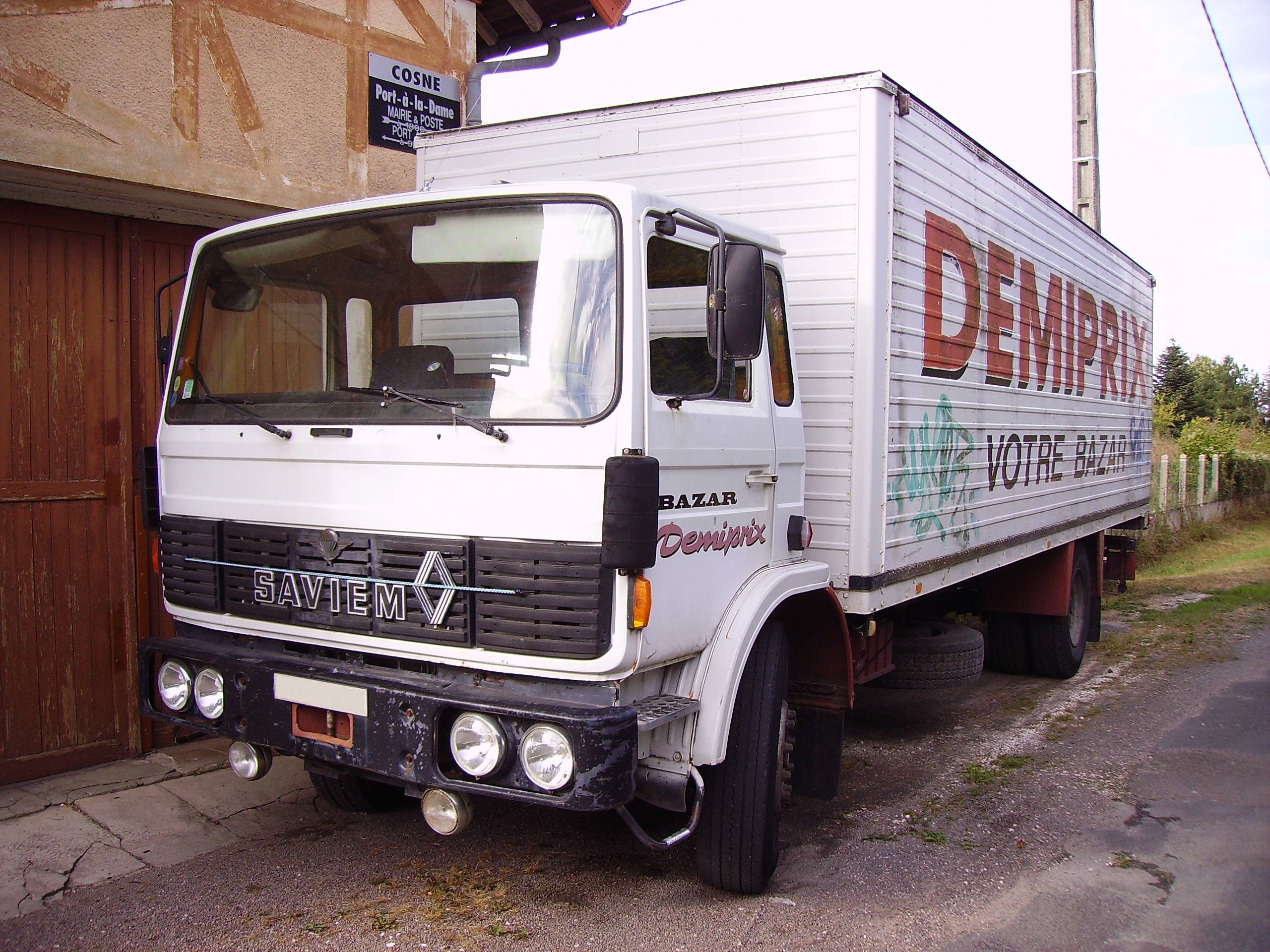

Overview
- Manufacturer: Saviem/RVI
- Production: 1977–1980
- Assembly: Blainville-sur-Orne, France

Body and chassis
- Class: Medium truck
- Body style: COE: Short cab; Sleeper cab

Powertrain
- Engine: 9.5L straight-five engine 8.8L straight-six engine 11.4L straight-six engine
- Transmission: 6-speed manual 12-speed manual

The Saviem H was a range of medium/heavy trucks manufactured by the French manufacturers Saviem and Renault Véhicules Industriels between 1977 and 1980.

== Characteristics ==
=== Dimensions ===
The cab used for the H range was the 875, an extended version of the Club of Four's 870 cab introduced in the lighter weight J range. The new cab was 240mm larger than the original. The H was offered as a tractor unit (HB) or rigid (HM).

=== Engines ===
The H range had a straight-six Berliet MID 06.20.30 engine, with a power output of 185 hp (138 kW) at 2400 rpm. It also mounted two MAN engines, the R5 and the R6. The R5 was a straight-five engine with a power output of 186 hp (139 kW) and the R6 was a straight-six with a power output of 220 hp (164 kW).
