= Renault Galion =

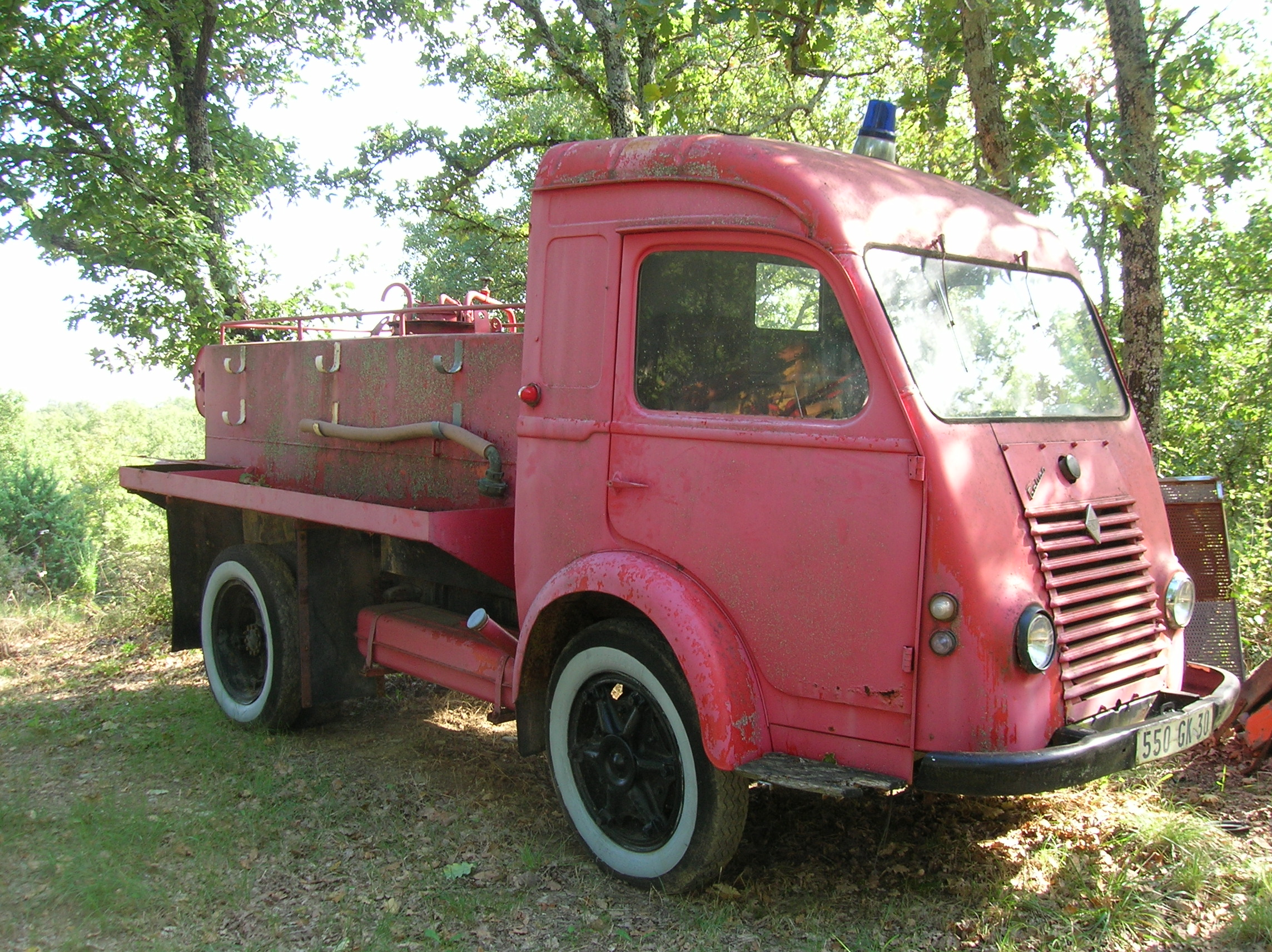

Overview
- Type: Light/medium truck/van
- Manufacturer: Renault; Saviem
- Also called: Renault 2,500 kg; Renault 2T5; Saviem Galion
- Production: 1947–1965
- Assembly: Boulogne-Billancourt, France; Blainville-sur-Orne, France

Body and chassis
- Layout: Front-engine, rear-wheel drive
- Related: Renault 1,400 kg

Powertrain
- Transmission: 4-speed manual

Dimensions
- Length: 5.20 m (17.1 ft)–6.5 m (21.3 ft)
- Width: 1.95 m (6.4 ft)–2.3 m (7.5 ft)
- Height: 2.43 m (8.0 ft)–2.7 m (8.9 ft)

Chronology
- Predecessor: Renault AHx
- Successor: Saviem Super Galion

The Renault 2,500 kg (or 2T5) and the Renault Galion were truck/vans with a 2.5-tonne carrying capacity manufactured by Renault between 1947 and 1957 and then by its subsidiary Saviem between 1957 and 1965.

== History ==
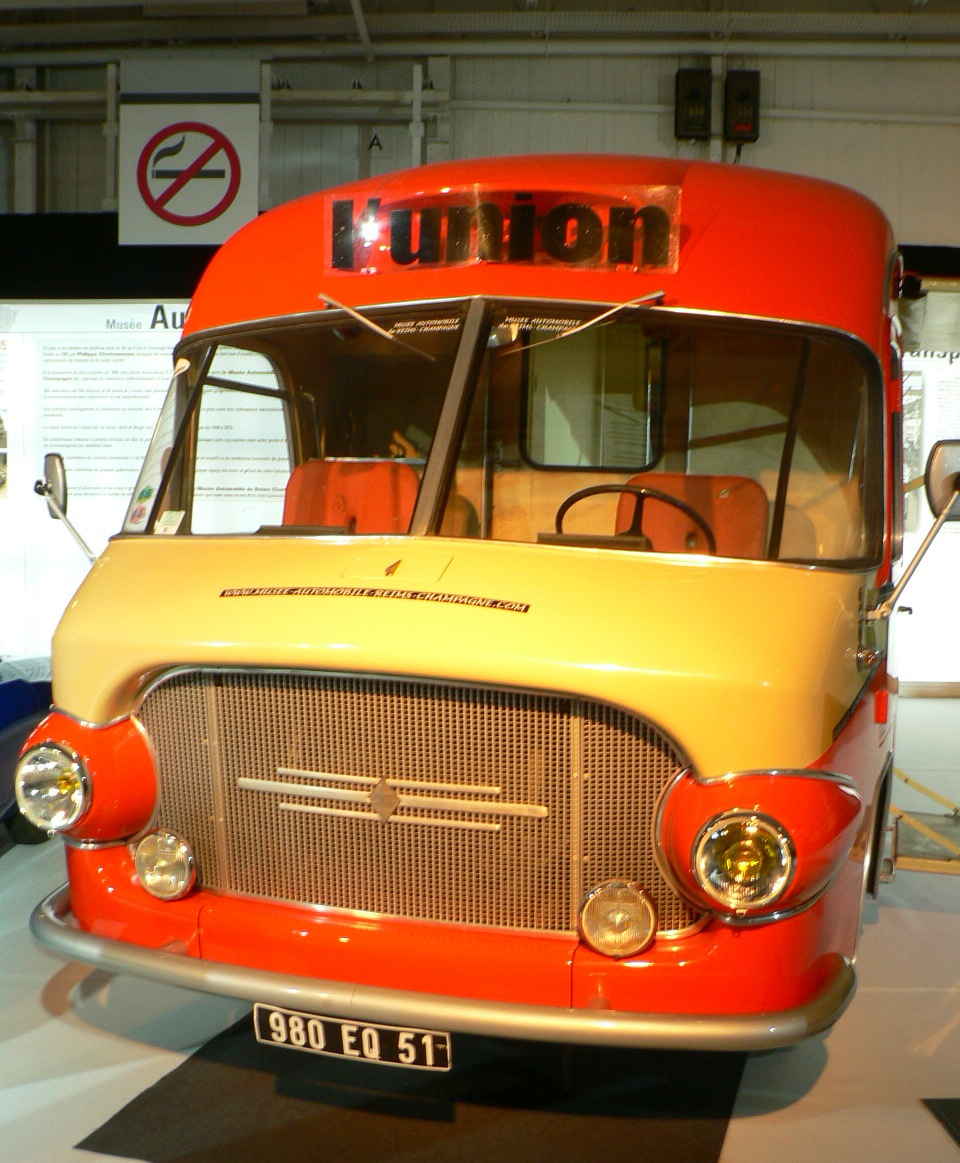
Renault Galion bus version

In 1947, Renault launched the Renault 2,500 kg light truck to replace the AHx series. The new vehicle was produced at Renault's main plant in Boulougne-Billancourt. In 1957, the company moved the production of some of its small commercial vehicle range to Saviem's Blainville-sur-Orne plant, which was built on the former site of the Cahen shipyards. They were the Goélette (loading capacity of up to 1.4 tonnes) and the Renault 2 T 5, renamed Galion (keeping loading capacity of up to 2.5 tonnes). The new models continued to be marketed as Renault. The Galion and Goélette names were officially introduced in 1959, prior to that they were still sold with the previous 1T4 and 2T5 denominations.

In 1965, following various revisions to the Galion design, Saviem introduced the more modern and powerful Saviem Super Galion range, and the Galion was discontinued.

== Technical details ==
By 1961, Saviem was producing between 50 and 60 Galions per day. At the time they were offered with at least two inline-four engines: the 3-litre diesel 4 192 supplied by Perkins, with a maximum power output of 52 bhp (39 kW) at 2,400 rpm and a 2-litre petrol Renault unit with a maximum power output of 56 bhp (42 kW) at 3,300 rpm. The truck had a rear-wheel drive transmission through a universal joint, coupled to a 4-speed manual gearbox. The Galion mounted various petrol engines. Some versions used the 668-8 with a maximum power output of 53 PS (39 kW; 52 bhp) at 3,300 rpm and a torque of 12.8 kg⋅m (126 N⋅m; 93 lb⋅ft) at 2,000. Other Galion versions used the 2.1-litre 671-2 Étendard. The 671-2 had a power output of 56 PS (41 kW; 55 bhp) at 3,300 rpm and a torque of 14.3 kg⋅m (140 N⋅m; 103 lb⋅ft) at 2,000 rpm. At the 1962 Paris Motor Show, Renault announced a new diesel engine for the Galion, replacing the Perkins unit. The new engine, called 580, was a 2.72-litre four-cylinder unit and had a power output of 58 bhp (43 kW) at 2,900 rpm and a torque of 115 lb⋅ft (156 N⋅m; 15.9 kg⋅m).

The truck had a single-disc manually operated clutch. The suspension was made of leaf springs on both axles, with hydraulic dampers. The steering was a recirculating ball type.

=== Variants and dimensions ===
By 1958, the bus version of the Galion had a length of 6.5 m (21.3 ft), a width of 2.3 m (7.5 ft) and a height of 2.7 m (8.9 ft). The R2167 rigid truck version dimensions were 5.24 m (17.2 ft), 2.2 m (7.2 ft) and 2.43 m (8.0 ft). For the R2167 flatbed they were 5.20 m (17.1 ft), 1.95 m (6.4 ft) and 2.43 m (8.0 ft). For the R2168 with extended flatbed, they were 6 m (19.7 ft), 1.98 m (6.5 ft) and 2.44 m (8.0 ft).

=== Codenames ===
The petrol versions of both the previous Renault 2T5 and the Renault Galion were codenamed R2160, R2161, R2162, R2163, R2164, R2165, R2166, R2167, R2168 and R2169; the diesel R4166, R4168, R4240, R4242, R4243, R4244, R4245, R4246 and R4247.
