= Renault Super Goélette =

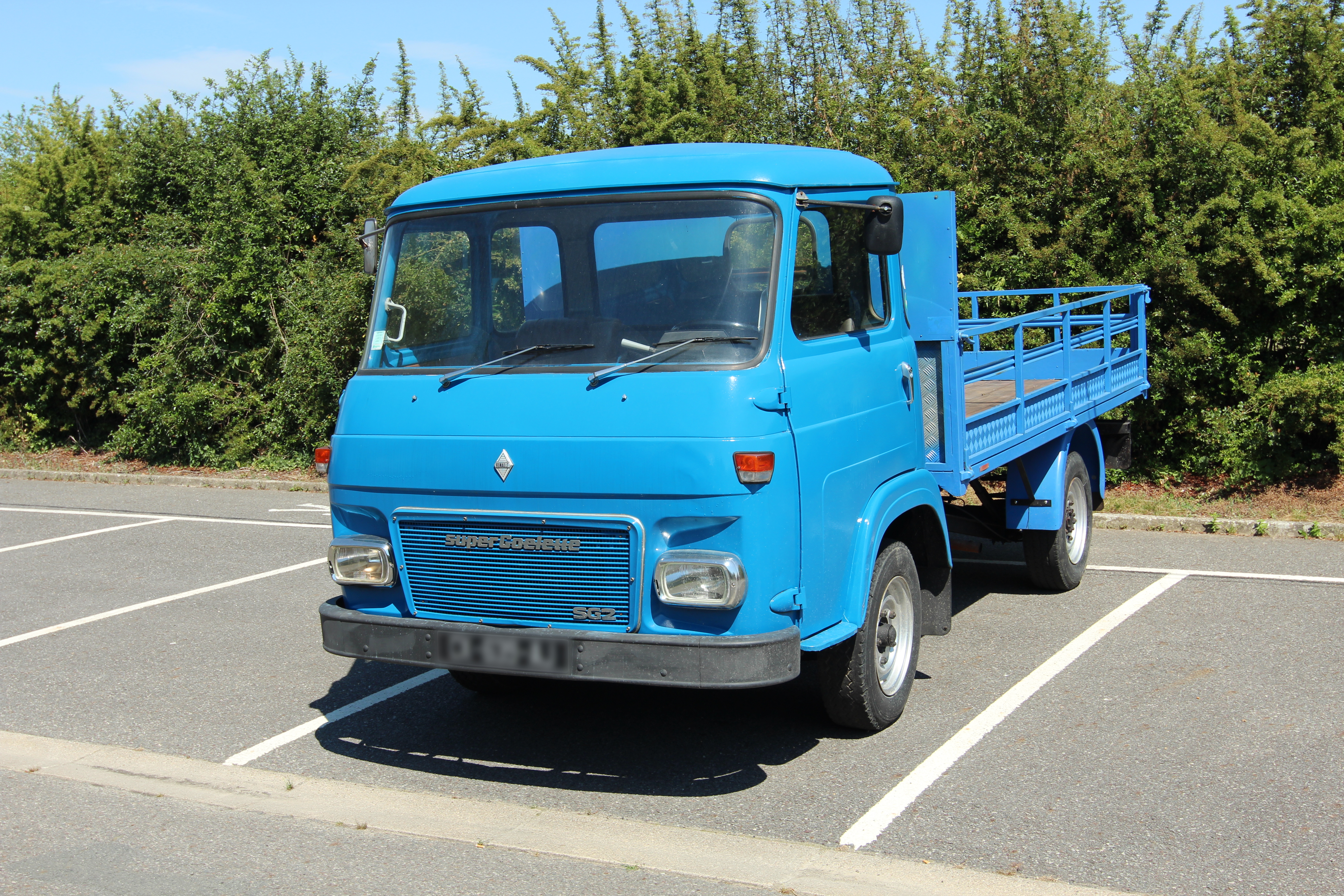

Overview
- Type: Light commercial vehicle
- Manufacturer: Saviem
- Also called: Saviem SG2; Saviem SG3; Saviem TP3; Saviem Trafic SB2; Alfa Romeo A15; MAN 270; Avia A15/A20/A21; Madara 201
- Production: 1965–1982; 1969–2000 (Avia)
- Assembly: Blainville-sur-Orne, France; Shumen, Bulgaria

Body and chassis
- Layout: Front-engine, front-wheel drive; Front-engine, rear-wheel drive; Front-engine, four-wheel drive
- Related: Saviem Super Galion

Powertrain
- Engine: Petrol; 2141 cc Renault 671-2 I4; 2607 cc Renault 817-01 I4; Diesel; 2.7 L Saviem 580-03 I4; 3017 cc Saviem 591-01 I4; 3017 cc Saviem 599-01/03 direct injection I4; 3319 cc Renault 712-01/03 direct injection I4

Dimensions
- Length: 4,997 mm (196.7 in)
- Width: 1,996 mm (78.6 in)
- Height: 2,540 mm (100.0 in)
- Curb weight: 1,520–2,300 kg (3,351.0–5,070.6 lb)

Chronology
- Predecessor: Renault 1 000 kg
- Successor: Renault Master/Renault B-series; Avia D series (Avia models)

The Renault Super Goélette is a van from the small commercial vehicle range (gross vehicle weight of 3.3 tonnes and 3.5 tonnes) manufactured by Saviem and marketed by Renault from 1965 to 1970, then from 1971 to 1980 by Saviem and finally by Renault Véhicules Industriels (RVI) between 1980 and 1982.

In June 1965, the Renault Super Goélette SG2 replaced the Goélette with new features: wide curved windscreen, replacement of the sheet metal dashboard, steering wheel shifter, front independent, variable flexibility suspension with coil springs (rear leaf spring suspension in 1967), telescopic shock absorbers and high ground clearance. However, the gasoline engine remained of the earlier "Étendard" type (as used in the Renault Frégate). The diesel engines were of a swirl chamber design, a 2.7-liter Saviem 580-03 was fitted to the SG 2 D and the 3-liter 591–01 to the Saviem Super Galion.

In the fall of 1966, the front end was revised: the windshield is enlarged downward, the grille is changed by abandoning its central bar and new lights were bi-colored. Inside, the dashboard was slightly changed.

In 1967, the rounded headlights became rectangular and two new variants appeared: the first a four-wheel-drive version (later called Saviem TP3) and the second a front-wheel-drive called Trafic SB2. This latest version was especially designed for urban deliveries, offering a low loading floor. The shifter was moved to the floor and the rear axle was rigid with springs. The diesel version switched to a version of Saviem's 3.0-litre four-cylinder, now with a MAN-licensed direct injection system. Two different outputs were available. Moreover, the Super Goélette SG2 was called Alfa Romeo-Saviem A15 in Italy. Saviem partner MAN marketed the SG2 in Germany, naming it MAN 270.

For 1969 models, the diesel versions were updated to the 712 series, still with MAN's direct injection but with a longer stroke and now displacing 3.3 litres. In 1971 a three-speed automatic transmission became available on the Super Goélette SG2. From 1970 the Super Goélette SG2 and SB2 Traffic were rebranded as the Saviems SG2 and SB2.

In January 1974, the SG3, incorporating dual rear wheels and rear suspension with leaf springs entered production. For 1977, the external appearance was again modernised with a large black plastic grille. On 21 April 1980, following the merger of Berliet and Saviem, the small range was sold under the RVI marque.

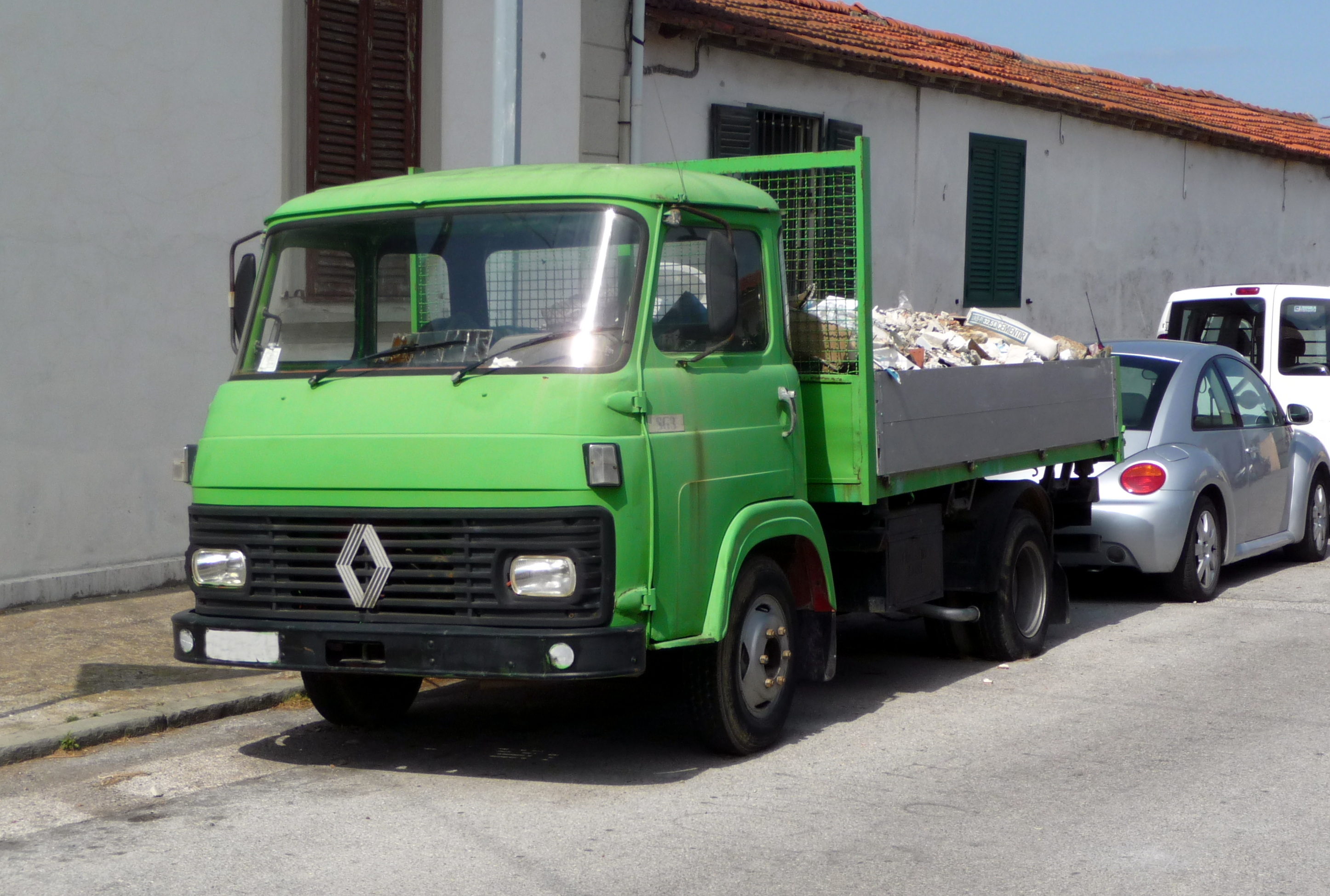
Avia-built Renault SG3

The SG2 van was common in the 1970s before being replaced by the Master in 1980. In 1982, the remaining SG3 range was replaced by the B-series. However, the SG2 and SG3 continued in production for certain export markets. Later, SG2 and SG3 were manufactured under license in Czechoslovakia by Avia, and these were also sold with Renault badging in some countries until the mid-1990s. Production of the Avia variant continued with many facelifts and modernizations until 2000, when it was replaced by the Avia D series.

The truck was also produced at the state-owned "Madara" Lorry Works in Shumen, Bulgaria under licence and with the technical assistance of Avia as the Madara 201. The enterprise had a working cooperation with the Czechoslovak Škoda, LIAZ, Avia and Soviet GAZ enterprises.

== Saviem TP3 ==
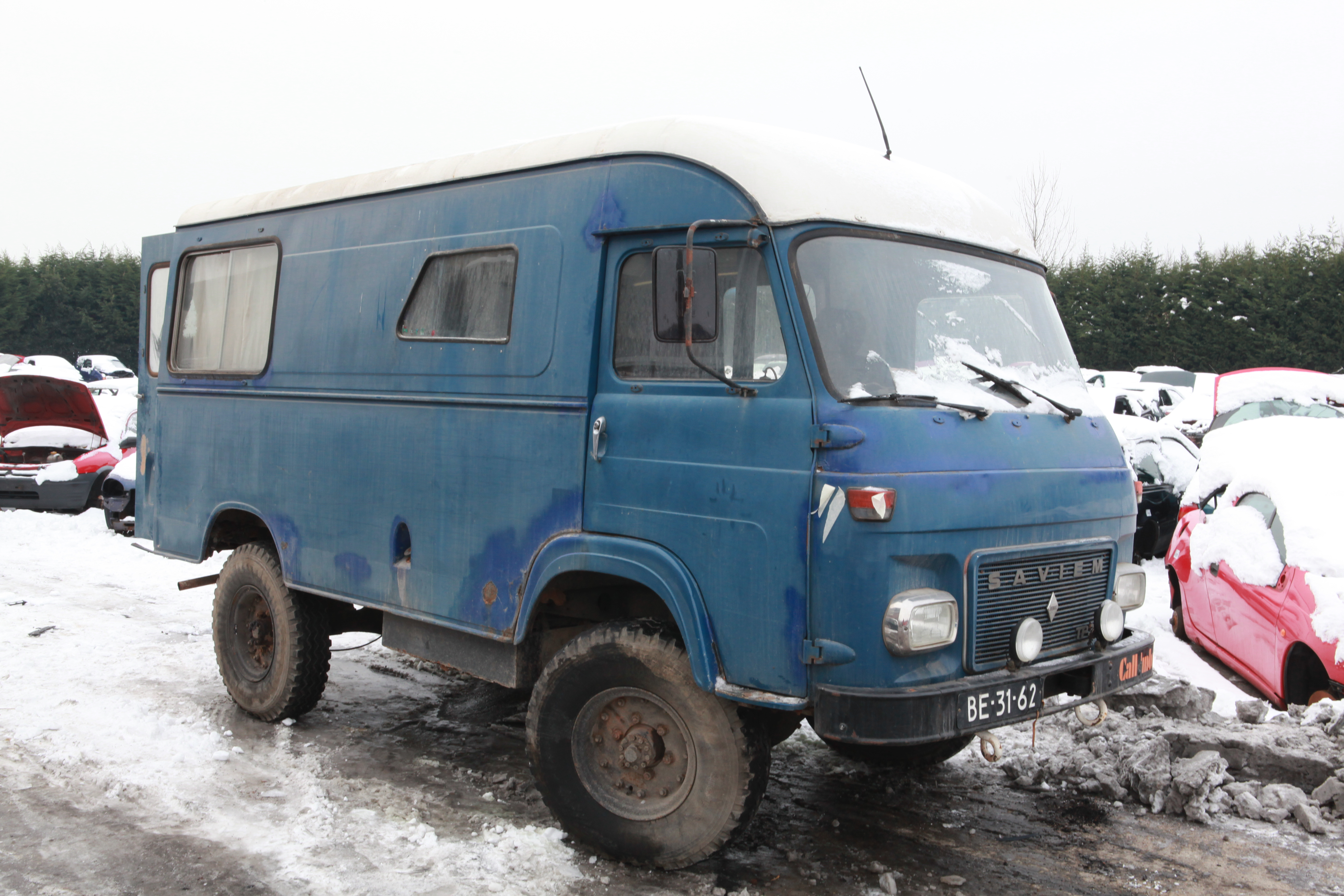
1970 Renault Saviem TP3

The TP3 was a militarized version of the Super Goélette van. Its production started in 1969 and it was designed to replace Renault's own 2087 Goélette 4x4 and the Simca Marmon, being also available as a platform truck and ambulance for use by the French army. The TP3 was presented at the Satory Military Equipment Exhibition in 1969. It had some differences from the civilian version, including a more powerful engine intended for the harsher conditions that the truck was supposed to be subjected to alongside the gearbox from the Saviem SM8. Production ended in 1983 after nearly 11,000 vehicles had been produced. Some vehicles were also exported and a small number was also sold to civilian operators.

The TP3 was succeeded by the Renault Messenger 4x4 and the bigger Renault TRM 2000, based on the civilian Saviem J and H models.
