= Société des usines Chausson =

Automobile manufacturer

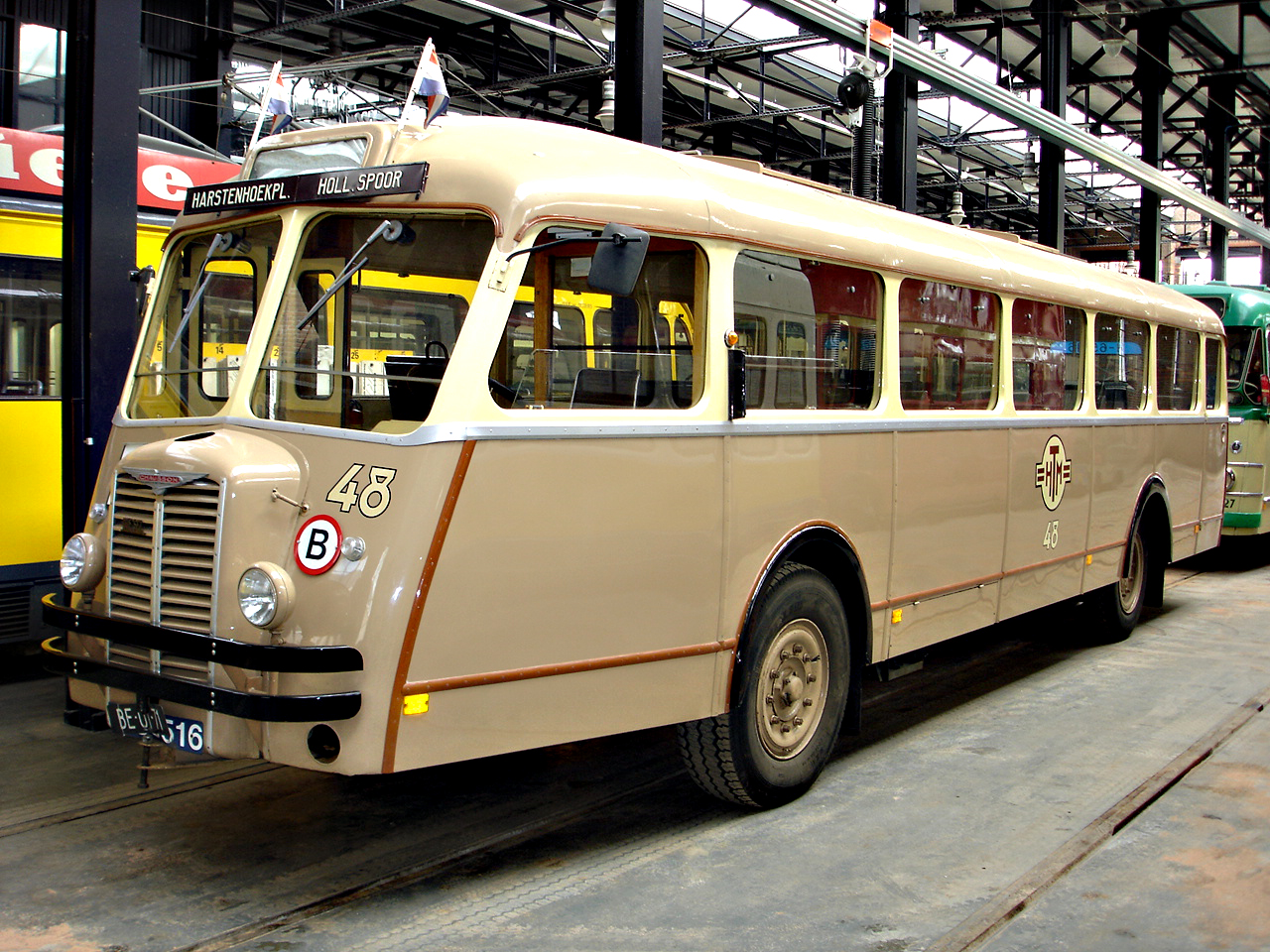
Early Chausson AP "hog nose" (1948) at the public transport museum in The Hague (NL)

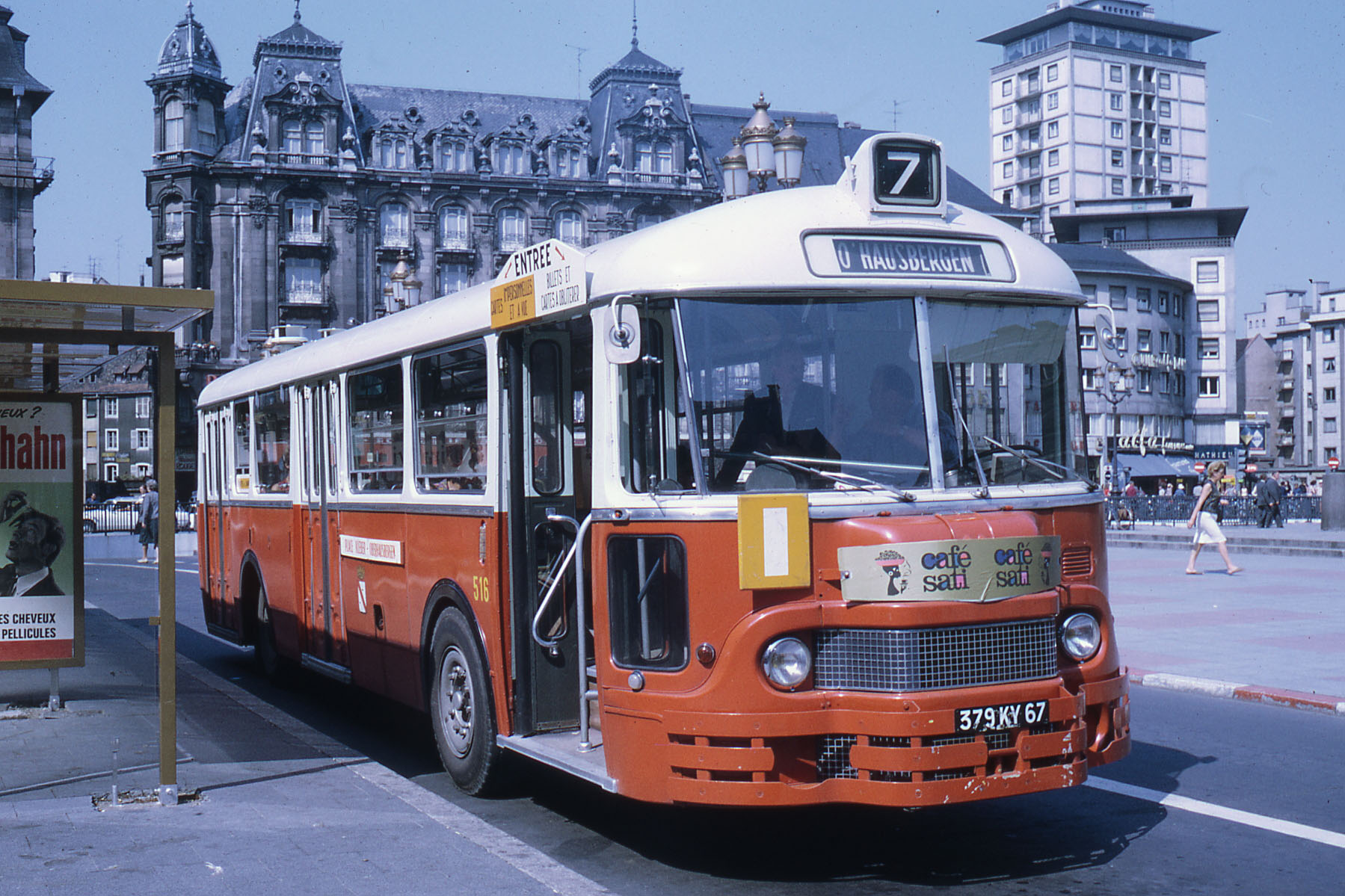
Chausson-Saviem SC4B transit bus (1963)

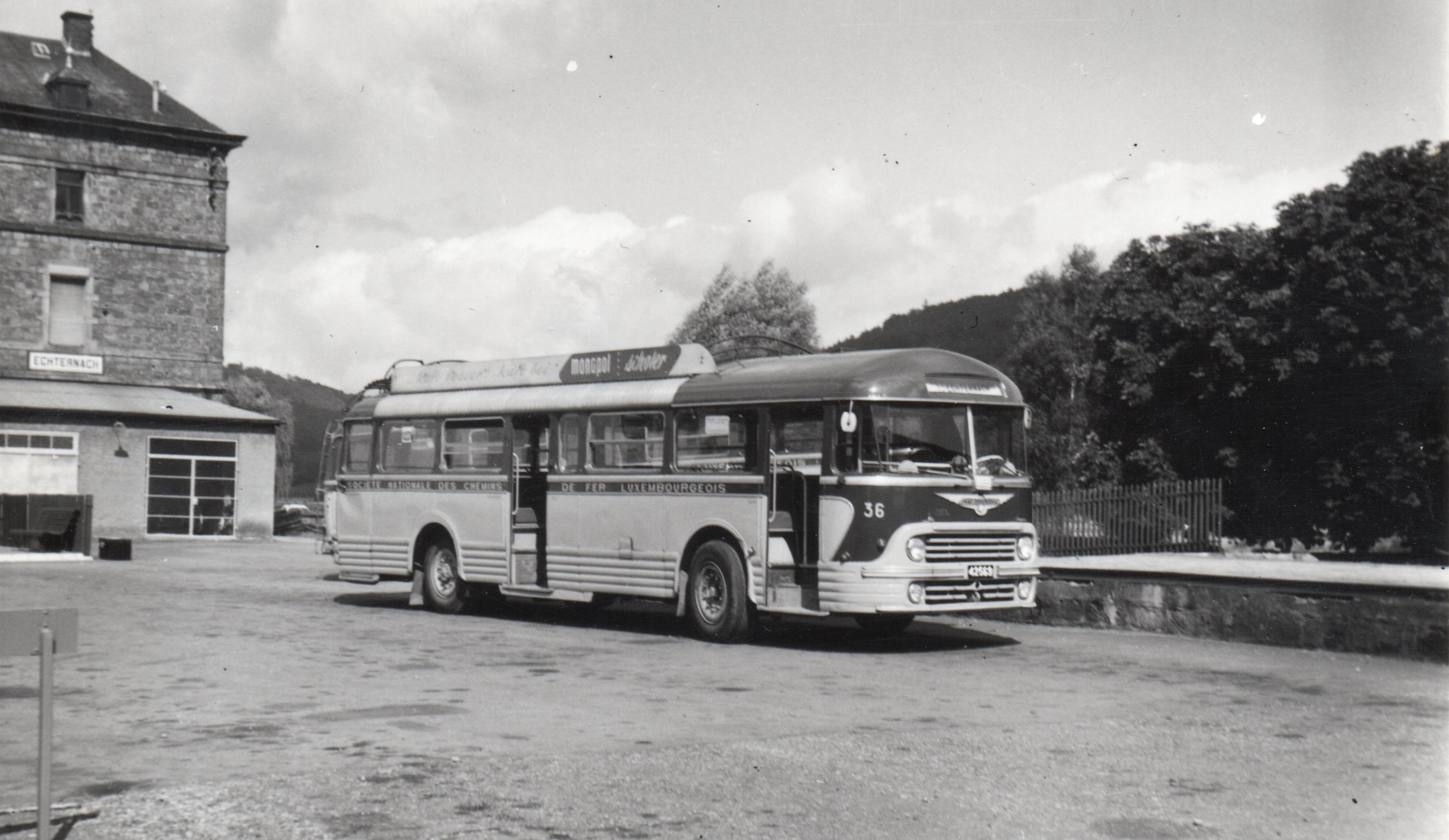
Chausson AP522 of Luxembourg National Railway Company

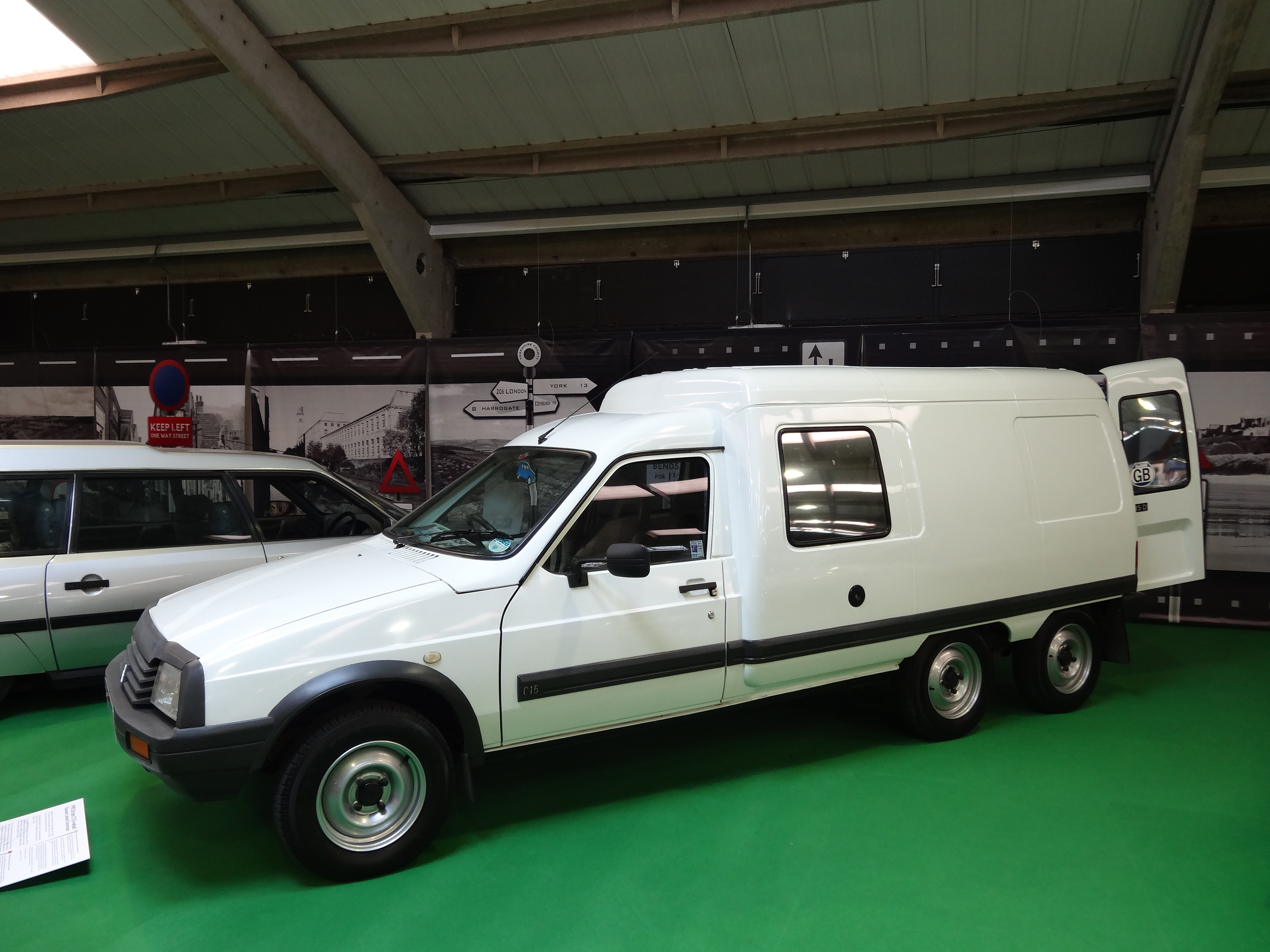
1995 Citroën C15 lengthened and fitted with a third axle by Chausson.

Société des usines Chausson was a French manufacturing company, based in the Paris region between 1907 and 2000, and known as a supplier of components to the automotive industry.

== History ==
Chausson was founded in 1907 as “Ateliers Chausson Frères” (“Chausson Brothers’ Factory”) in 1907 by two brothers called Jules and Gaston Chausson. The target customers were France's automakers and production was focused on metal components such as radiators and other cooling components, tanks and tubes for use in engines as components in fuel feed and exhaust systems.

The company continued to specialise in heat exchangers, and added car bodies to its range of specialities after the 1930s when, following a trend that had originated in the United States, steel bodies became the norm for automakers in Europe. In 1940 the factory was producing certain parts for the Dewoitine D.520 fighter aircraft and there were plans to set up a production line for the D.521, which was a lighter Rolls-Royce Merlin equipped version of the Dewoitine D.520, but production was aborted due to the occupation and Armistice. After setting up ”Autocars Chausson” in 1942 attention was increasingly focused on bus bodies during the middle decades of the twentieth century. During the 1950s Chausson supplied hundreds of buses to the RATP for use in and around Paris.

During the post war boom, by now with Peugeot and Renault its principal shareholders, Chausson also produced bodies for light commercial vehicles such as the Peugeot J7, Peugeot J9, Peugeot 404 pickup and Citroën C35. Renault models bodied by Chausson included versions of the Renault 4 Fourgonette; a small van based on the Renault 4, Renault Estafette and Renault Trafic. During the 1960s and 1970s the company also produced, generally in smaller volumes and more sporadically, bodies for coupés such as the Renault Floride/Caravelle, the Opel GT and the Citroën SM.

Activity peaked in the 1970s by when the business employed approximately 15,000 people, and was operating factories at Asnières-sur-Seine, Gennevilliers, Meudon, Reims, Creil, Maubeuge and Laval. By now Chausson had absorbed or been merged with other companies in the automotive sector such as Chenard et Walcker and Brissonneau and Lotz.

During the 1990s, with rapid industrial growth a receding memory and employment levels already well down on the peak of twenty years earlier, Chausson became known as a textbook case of industrial “restructuring”. The company was obliged to seek court protection from its creditors, under a procedure known at that time as a ”Dépôt de bilan”, obtaining a debt moratorium in September 1993. Between 1993 and 1995 three ”Social Plans” involved the loss of a further 2,549 jobs.

The company's last production facility, at Gennevilliers, closed in 2000.

== Bibliography ==
- Danièle Linhart, Perte d'emploi, perte de soi, Érès, 2002. ISBN 2749200784
- Bernard Massera et Daniel Grason, Chausson : une dignité ouvrière, Editions Syllepse, 2004. ISBN 978-2-84797-084-5
