= Renault AHx =

Range of light/medium trucks manufactured by Renault

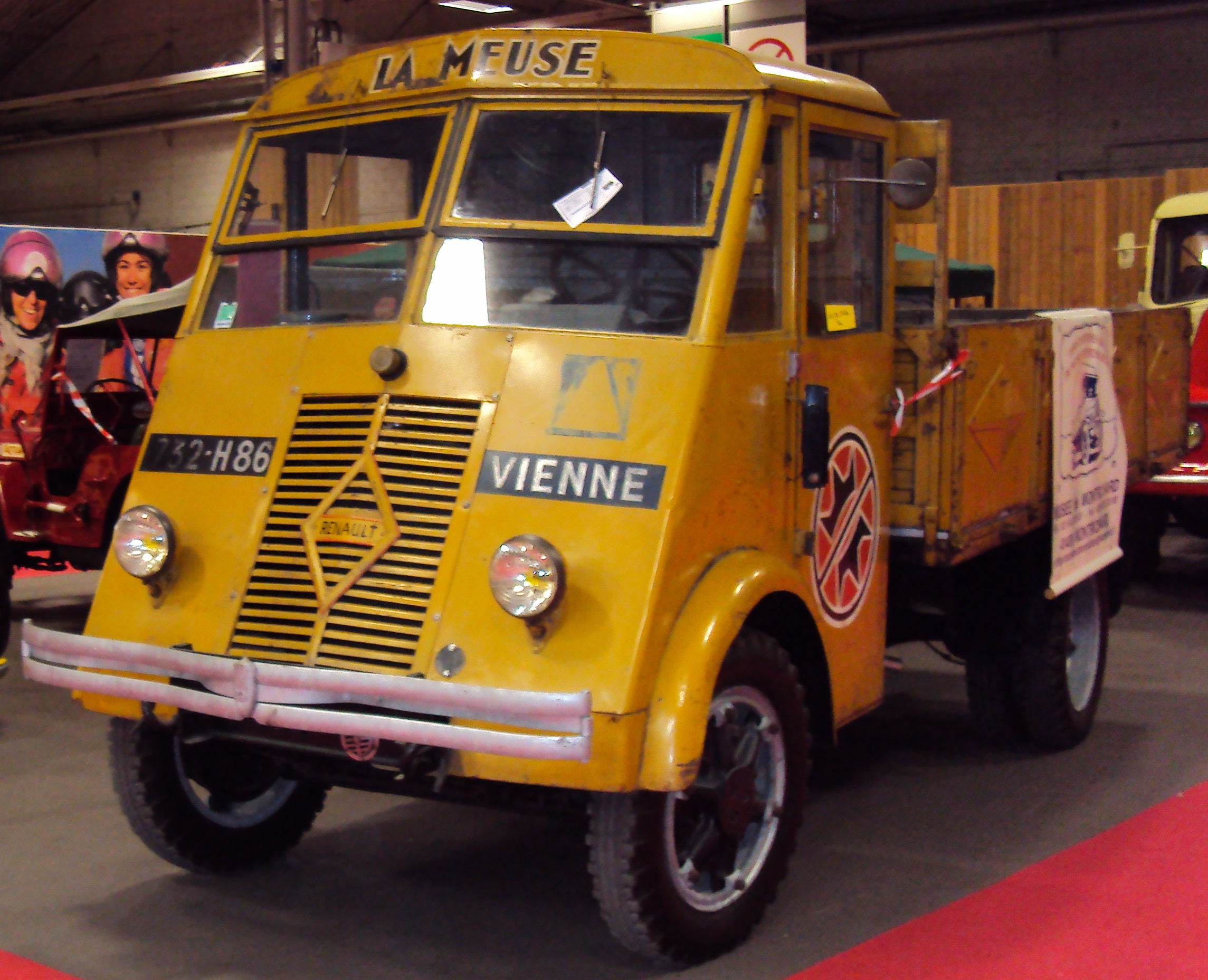
- Renault AHS

Overview
- Type: Light/medium truck
- Manufacturer: Renault
- Also called: Renault AHS; Renault AHN; Renault AHR
- Production: 1941–1947
- Assembly: Boulogne-Billancourt, France

Body and chassis
- Layout: Front-engine, rear-wheel drive

Powertrain
- Transmission: 4-speed manual

Chronology
- Predecessor: Renault AGx
- Successor: Renault Galion

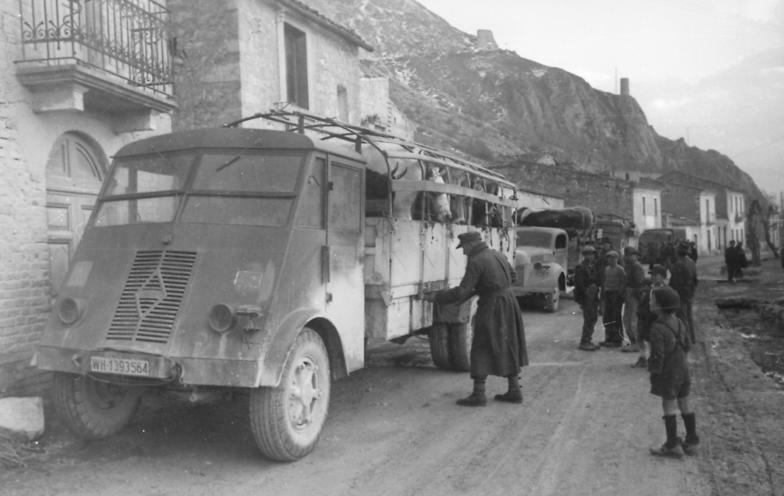
A Renault AHN2 at an Italian town in 1943, during World War II

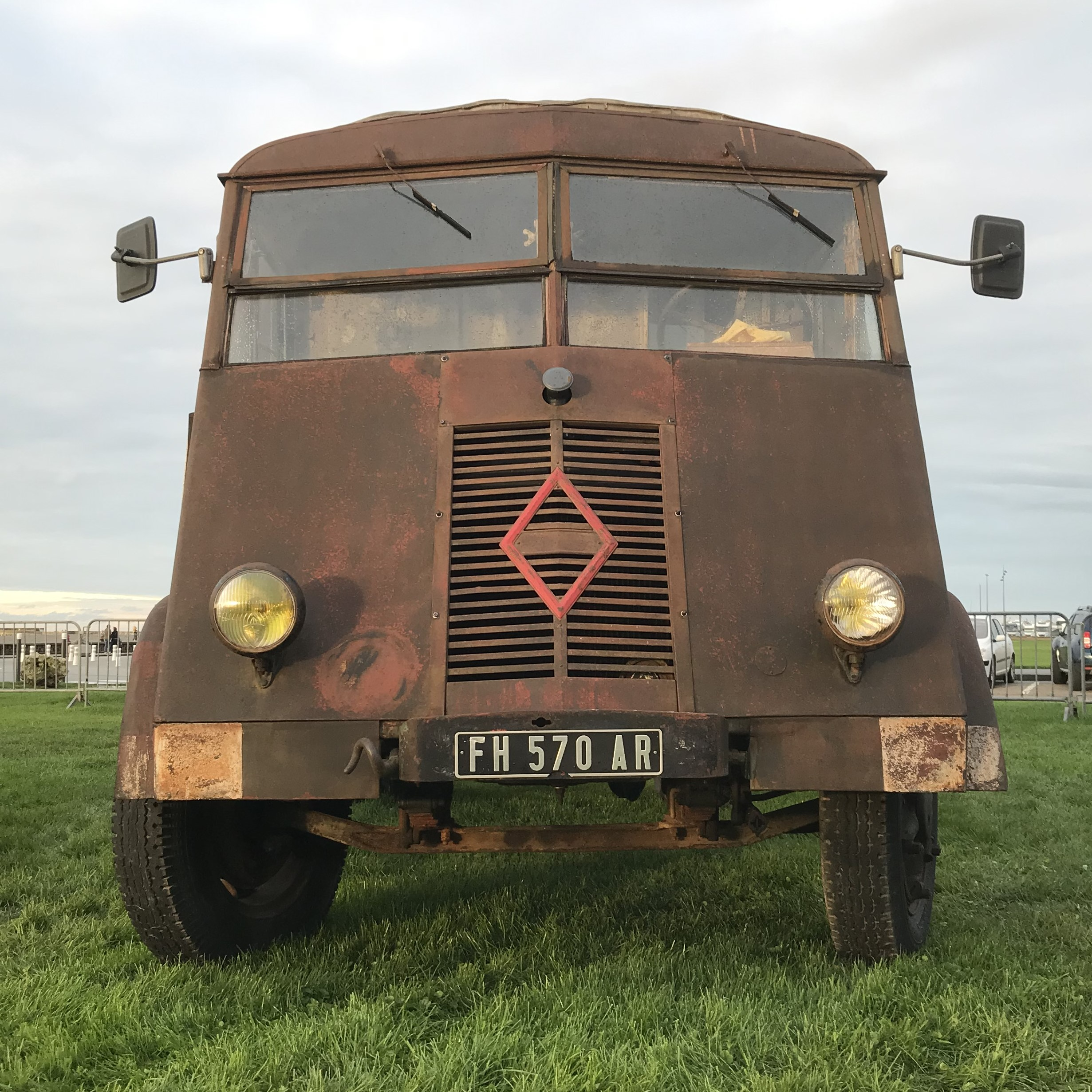
Renault AHN seen in Dieppe (October 2024)

The Renault AHx was a range of light/medium trucks with carrying capacities from 2 to 5 tonnes manufactured by Renault between 1941 and 1947. Various versions were used in World War II by the German forces.

== History ==
Prototypes of the first AHx truck, the AHS2, were unveiled by 1939. It was aimed at replacing the similar AGC truck (which had a maximum payload of 1.5 tonnes). The truck was designed to be used by the French military on the 2.5-tonne carrying capacity group, but it was rejected. The Wehrmacht in turn ordered the production of the model, reclassifying it as a 2-tonne payload model and naming it Lastkraftwagen 2 to. The AHN (4-tonne payload) was the successor of the AGR and was produced for the Wehrmacht with the designation Lastkraftwagen 3.5 to. The heaviest AHx model, the AHR, was produced with a 5-tonne payload and, as the two other versions, was used by the Germans. The Wehrmacht was supplied with about 23,000 AHS, 4,000 AHN, and between 1,000 and 2,000 AHR.

After the war, evolutions of the AHS2 and AHN (AHS3/AHS4 and AHN2/AHN3) with 2 and 3.5 tonnes of payload respectively, were produced mainly for the civilian market. In 1947, these trucks were replaced by the Renault Galion. The AHx cabin was also the basis for a 7-tonne payload truck, the Renault 208 E1.

== Technical details ==
The AHS has a 2.38-litre inline-four petrol engine (delivering 52 metric horsepower (38 kW)) while the AHN and AHR use a 4.05-litre inline-six petrol unit, the latter with a power output of 75 brake horsepower (56 kW). The three models had a 4-speed manual gearbox. Both the Renault AHS and the AHN have gasifier-equipped versions using engines similar to the petrol versions. The AHS version (AHSH) has a power output of 35 metric horsepower (26 kW) at 2,800 rpm while the AHN version (AHNH) has a power output of 52 metric horsepower (38 kW) at 2,800 rpm.

The AHx range has a cab forward layout, a design introduced by Renault in 1934 and gradually extended to all its truck lineup. The AHN has a height of 2.6 metres, a length of 6.4 metres and a width of 2.4 metres.
