= Saviem Super Galion =

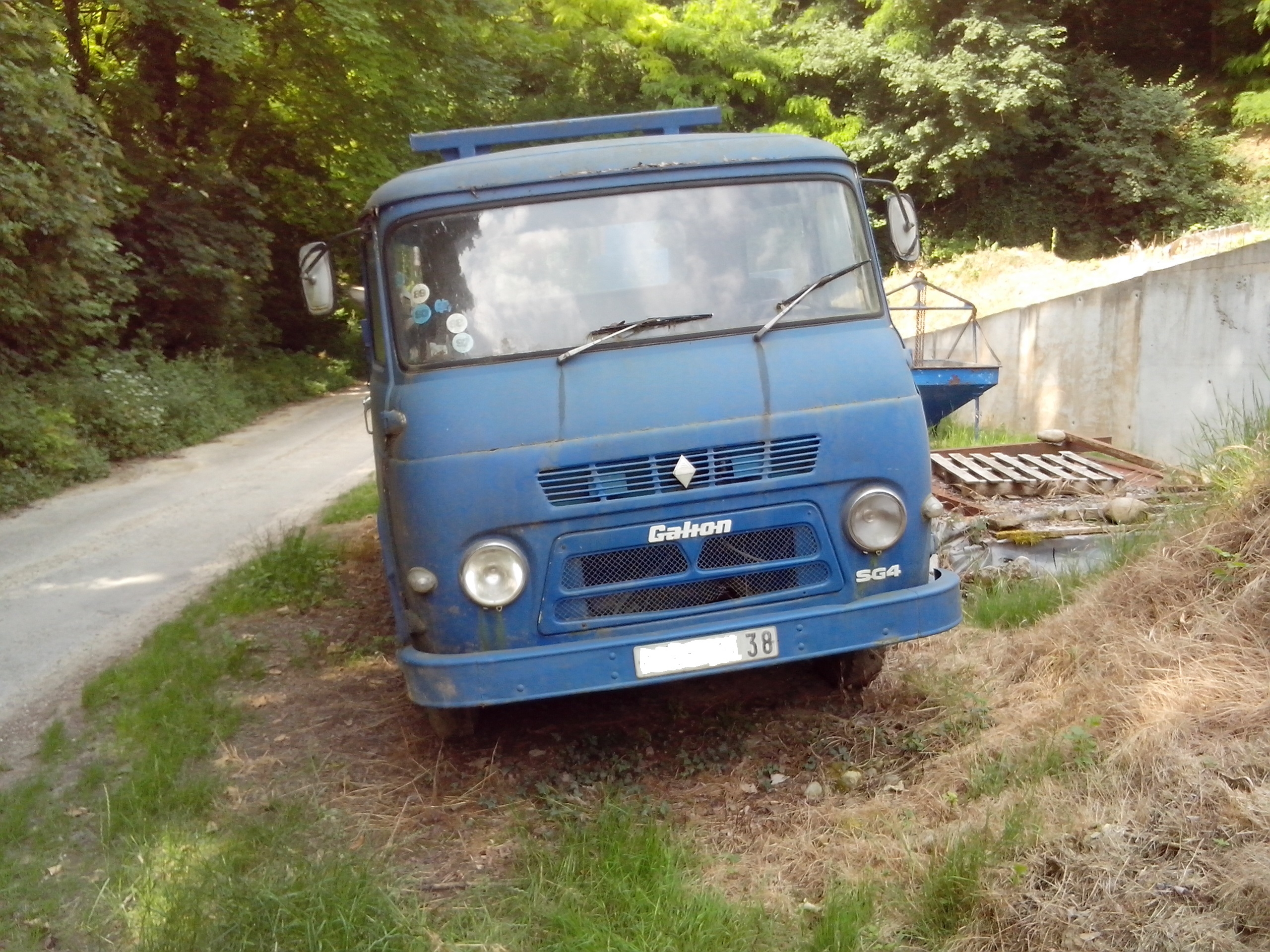
- An early-design Super Galion

Overview
- Type: Light/medium truck
- Manufacturer: Saviem
- Also called: Renault Super Galion; Saviem SG4; Saviem SG5; Alfa Romeo A38; Avia A30
- Production: 1965–1982
- Assembly: Blainville-sur-Orne, France

Body and chassis
- Layout: Front-engine, rear-wheel drive
- Related: Renault Super Goélette

Powertrain
- Engine: Petrol; 2.1 litres; 2.6 litres; Diesel; 3 litres; 3.32 litres
- Transmission: 4-speed manual

Dimensions
- Wheelbase: 2,680 mm (106 in) (in most versions, 1970); 3,240 mm (128 in) (long version, 1970); 3,640 mm (143 in) (extra long version, 1970)
- Length: 5,177 mm (204 in) (in most versions, 1970); 6,367 mm (251 in) (long version, 1970); 6,967 mm (274 in) (extra long version, 1970)
- Width: 78.8 in (2,002 mm) (1970)
- Height: 90 in (2,286 mm) (1970)

Chronology
- Predecessor: Renault/Saviem Galion

The Saviem Super Galion is a truck under 6 tonnes gross vehicle weight (GVW) produced by the French manufacturer Saviem between 1965 and 1982. It was also marketed as the Renault Super Galion.

== History ==
In 1957, Saviem introduced the Galion, a small commercial vehicle based on previous Renault models with a 2.5-tonne payload and related to the smaller Goélette. In 1965, as part of a renovation of the company's small vehicle range, the Saviem Super Galion was introduced along with the lighter Super Goélette. The new truck had a 5.950-tonne GVW, right under the limit after which the acquisition would have been required special permits in France. At the 1968 Paris Show, a new version of the Super Galion called the SG5 was unveiled, with changes to the suspension and gearbox. The design was revised in 1968, 1969 and 1979, in line with the Super Goélette revisions. From 21 April 1980 onwards, the truck was sold under the RVI badge.

=== International ===
Through a partnership agreement, the Super Galion was assembled by the Czech manufacturer Avia and marketed as the Avia A30. It was also assembled under licence by Alfa Romeo, which sold it as the Alfa Romeos A38 and F20. MAN marketed the model badging it as 475 and 7-90.

After being shipped to Senegal, Super Galions were turned into car rapides (lit. 'fast cars' in French). They were painted colorfully and included Sufi and local Senegalese cultural imagery. In 2016, their discontinuation was announce, with them to be replaced with buses. A car rapide is exhibited at the Musée de l'Homme in Paris.

== Technical details ==
=== Engines ===
By 1970, the most common engine for the SG4 was the 3.32-litre straight-four Renault-Saviem 712-01 diesel, using a MAN-sourced direct injection system and with a maximum power output of 85 bhp (63 kW) at 3,200 rpm and a torque of 149 lb⋅ft (202 N⋅m) at 2,000 rpm. The first diesel engine used for the model was the 3-litre straight-four Renault-Saviem 591–01, with a Ricardo fuel injection system and a maximum power output of 75 PS (74 bhp; 55 kW) at 3,200 rpm and a torque of 180 N⋅m (130 lb⋅ft) at 2,000 rpm. The 591-01 was followed in 1968 by the similar 599–01, which simply changed the Ricardo's fuel injection for a direct fuel injection sourced by MAN. It was replaced shortly after by the 712–01. The petrol engines were, at launch, the 2.1-litre Renault Étendard 671, with a maximum power output of 70 PS (69 bhp; 51 kW). In 1968, it was replaced by the 2.6-litre 817 with a power output of 78 PS (77 bhp; 57 kW) at 3,600 rpm and a torque of 20.5 kg⋅m (201 N⋅m; 148 lb⋅ft) at 2,000 rpm.

=== Dimensions and variants ===
By 1970, the Super Galion was offered for sale with three options: bare metal chassis (for coachbuilding), cabin with only lateral panels (also for coachbuilding) and with complete bodywork. The wheelbases offered are between 2,680 mm (106 in) and 3,640 mm (143 in), the length is between 5,177 mm (204 in) and 6,967 mm (274 in). The width is 78.8 in (2,002 mm) and the height 90 in (2,286 mm) (on the versions with complete bodywork).

=== Suspension, transmission and related systems ===
The truck has an independent front suspension with coil springs and wishbones. At the rear it mounts a beam axle with leaf springs instead of the coil springs used by the similarly designed Super Goélette. It has telescopic dampers on both axles. The transmission is a rear-wheel drive system with a fully synchronised 4-speed gearbox. The drivetain has a double universal joint on the normal chassis and a triple universal joint with relay shaft on the long and extra long. Brakes are drums on both axles. The steering system is a gammer worm and roller.
