= Saviem J =

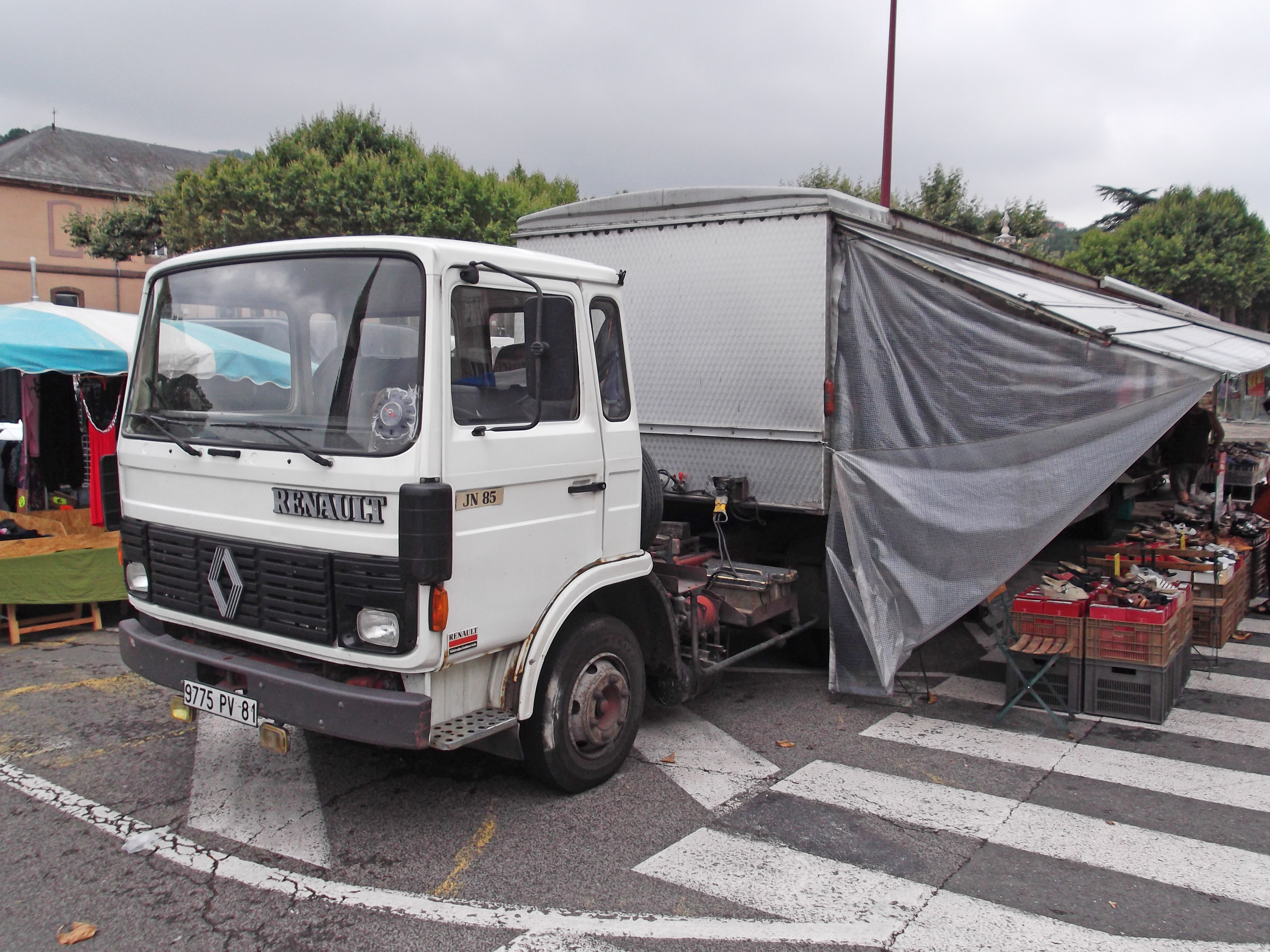

Overview
- Manufacturer: Saviem/RVI
- Also called: Renault J
- Production: 1975–1980
- Assembly: Blainville-sur-Orne, France

Body and chassis
- Class: Medium truck
- Body style: COE

Powertrain
- Engine: 3.6 L Saviem 720 diesel I4; 5.4 L Saviem 597 diesel I6; 5.4 L Saviem 598 td I6
- Transmission: 5-speed manual

Chronology
- Predecessor: Saviem SG4 (for some applications)/Saviem SM
- Successor: Renault S Midliner

The Saviem J was a range of medium-duty trucks manufactured by the French manufacturers Saviem and Renault Véhicules Industriels between 1975 and 1980.

== History ==
In the early 1970s, DAF, Magirus-Deutz, Volvo and Saviem formed the Club of Four to develop and manufacture a medium-duty truck. In order to do this, the company European Truck Development (ETD) was established in the Netherlands.

The Saviem version of this new truck range, the J, entered into production in 1975 and was fitted with MAN engines assembled under licence at Saviem's Limoges factory. Later, the range incorporated other engines. It went on sale in Britain in 1979, shortly before the name was changed to Renault.

== Characteristics ==
=== Dimensions ===
The range was originally composed of three models: JN 90, JP 11 and JP 13, with the latter being subdivided into 13A, B and C.

The JN 90 was a 9-ton GVW (gross vehicle weight) truck with various wheelbases from 2.7 to 5.05 metres (8.9 to 16.6 ft). The JP 11s were 11-ton GVW models with wheelbases from 2.85 to 5.2 metres (9.4 to 17.1 ft). The JP 13 had various combinations of engine and dimensions available.

Later, the company introduced the lighter, four-cylinder JK range: JK 60 (6-ton GVW), JK 65 (6.5-ton GVW) and JK 75 (7.5-ton GVW). Wheelbases ranged from 2.7 to 4.45 metres (8.9 to 14.6 ft). The six-cylinder JN added various version between 7.5 and 8.5-ton GVW. Saviem also introduced the JR/JX range for trucks over 19-ton GVW.

=== Engines ===
The first engines of the J range were two 5.49L straight-six engines (the 597 and the 598) which had been fitted previously to the Saviems SM7 and SM8. The 597 was an atmospheric with a power output of 112 kW (150 hp) at 2,900 rpm and a torque of 402 N⋅m (296 lb⋅ft) at 1,700 rpm. The 598 was turbocharged and had a maximum power output of 127 kW (170 hp) and a torque of 454 N⋅m (335 lb⋅ft). The JK range added the 720 straight-four MAN-licensed engines, producing 67 kW (90 hp) at 3,000 rpm and 172 lb⋅ft (233 N⋅m) at 1,680 rpm.

=== Transmission ===
A single gearbox, the S 5.35 type from ZF, was used on all the range. It was a fully synchronized five-speed unit. Later were incorporated the S 5.25 (for the JK models) and a Saviem-made unit.

=== Suspension ===
The J range had a suspension of leaf springs with dampers and anti-roll bars at the front and rear. The steering is a worm and sector setup.
