= Renault 1 000 kg =

Renault 1000 Kg
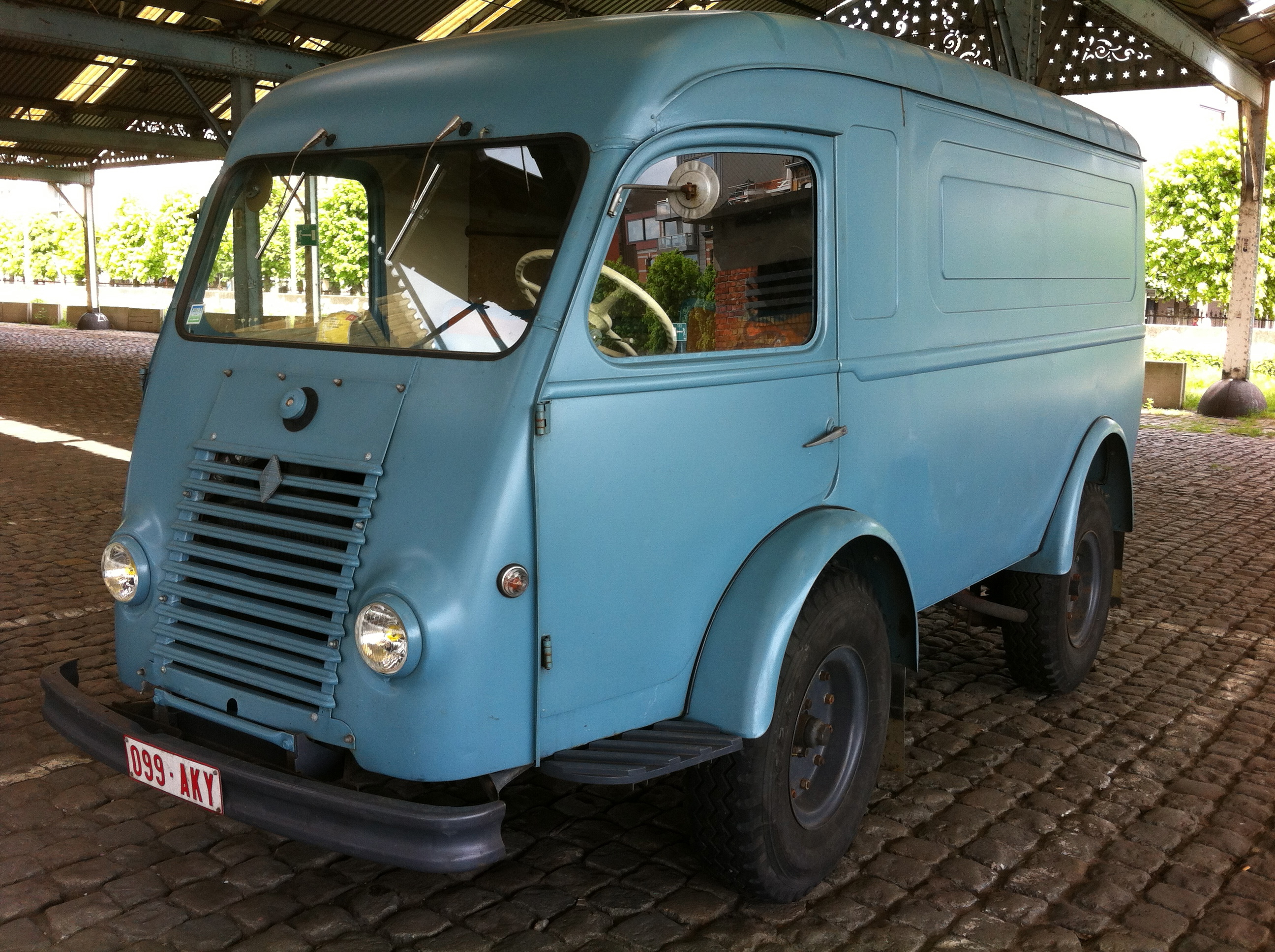

Overview
- Manufacturer: Renault
- Also called: Renault 206 E1; (1949-1959) Renault 1 400 Kg; (1959-1963) Renault Voltigeur (1 000 Kg); (1959-1965) Renault Goélette (1 400 Kg)
- Production: 1947–1965; 124,570 units

Body and chassis
- Class: Van
- Body style: Various light van and light truck configurations. Available as a chassis cab for specialist body builders.
- Layout: Front-engine, rear-wheel-drive
- Related: Renault 2500 Kg; Renault Galion

Powertrain
- Engine: Petrol/gasoline: 2,383cc I4 (1947 - 1956); 1,996cc I4 (1952 - 1965); 2,141cc I4 (1956 – 1965); Diesel: 1,816cc I4 Indenor (1961 – 1962); 2,720cc I4 (1962 – 1965)

Dimensions
- Length: 4,540 mm (178.7 in)
- Width: 1,920 mm (75.6 in)
- Height: 2,250 mm (88.6 in)

Chronology
- Successor: Renault Super Goélette

The Renault 1 000 kg is a light van, initially of a one-ton capacity, introduced by the manufacturer in 1947. A 1,400 kg version followed in 1949, and the Renault 1,400 kg soon became the more popular choice. A name change in 1959 saw the vans branded as the Renault Voltigeur (1,000 kg) and the Renault Goélette (1,400 kg), but in retrospect the Renault 1,000 kg name is frequently preferred.

== Origins ==
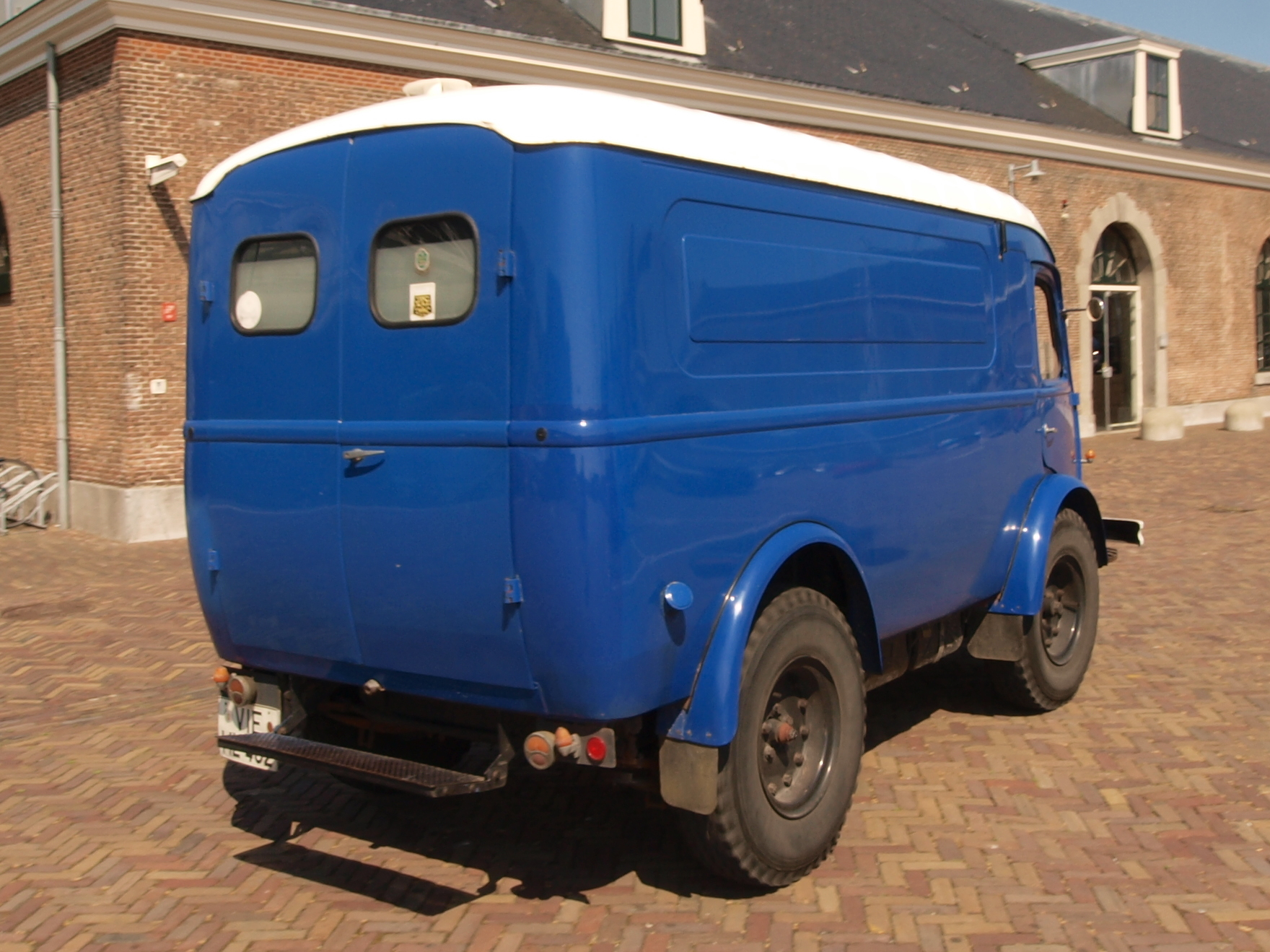
1954 Renault Goelette

The 1000 kg was originally presented in 1945 as a prototype light van designed for the military, and was offered for general sales from February 1947.

In the summer of 1944 the French Ministry of Industrial Production set out a prescriptive plan for the post war motor industry. It was headed by Paul-Marie Pons and it was known as the Plan Pons. Under "The Plan", Renault and Peugeot (along with their Chenard & Walcker debtor/subsidiary) were restricted to making vans for the 1000–1400 kg market, while Citroën was to make small trucks of between 2 and 3.5 tonnes. In the event Citroën, which had already developed a van in the 1000 kG class before the war, went ahead with the design of the Citroën H Van, which was launched in 1947. It was the Citroën which would be Renault's most effective rival in this sector, although Renault would in the early years beat its rival on volumes thanks in part to the large number of Renaults produced for military and police use and for other public sector vehicle operators such as the French postal service. Police versions gained the informal appellation “panier à salade” (“paddy wagon”), appearing in newsreels removing arrested suspects following instances of civil disturbance during the troubled 1950s or, more memorably for many United States and UK film-goers in the 1960s, removing Inspector Clouseau following his arrest in the wake of a successful bank raid.

Renault followed the Plan Pons agreement and designed the 206 E1 following general pre-war design ideas. It had a chassis onto which the van body was bolted and the body was made, until 1950, by fitting metal panels to a wooden frame. At a time when French industrial wages were low, the Renault was quick and inexpensive to produce.

== Vehicle architecture ==
In contrast to the rival Citroën H Van, Renault's design applied a traditional approach, using a rear wheel drive layout and rigid axles. Large wheels combined with a short wheelbase allowed for a tight turning circle and good ground clearance. These features reflected plans for a four-wheel drive version in anticipation of military sales and to deal with the poor state of many French roads, especially in the countryside, at this time. The rear-wheel drive and big wheels resulted in the vehicle's raised interior floor height. Renault saw a steady demand for the van, especially from public sector buyers, and 124,570 units of vehicles were produced. By some criteria, it was France's best selling vehicle in its class during the 1950s.

== Chronology ==
The basic architecture and overall silhouette of the vehicle barely changed during a production run of nearly two decades, but there were numerous minor changes to the sheet metal, door hinge arrangements, front bumpers, lights and indicators as well as extensive adaptations for military and police versions. Later models, from the 1960s, can be distinguished by a small additional windows behind each of the side-doors.

At launch the vehicle appeared as a boxy flat sided van with an advertised load volume of 7.45 m^{3} which compared with 7.3 m^{3} for the Citroën H as it appeared in the same year. The Renault's 2,383cc petrol engine had originally been introduced in 1936 for the Renault Primaquatre; slightly downtuned for this application it offered 62 PS (46 kW; 61 hp). The dry weight of 1,735 kg (3,825 lb) provided a maximum laden weight of 2,735 kg (6,030 lb).

In 1947, a flatbed truck version appeared along with a bare chassis version enabling users to specify their own bespoke body variants from specialist truck-body builders.

In July 1949, a heavy duty 1,400 kg version joined the range, and this was also the year when four-wheel drive became an advertised option. By 1952, Renault offered a more modern engine for economy minded buyers and a detuned version of the 1996 cc 49 PS (36 kW; 48 hp) unit from the recently introduced Renault Frégate was an option for the 1,000 kg model.

The Renault Colorale station wagon also used some mechanical parts alongside the engine from the 1 000 kg, which was made intentionally in order to provide the vehicle with the same durability and reliability.

In 1959 the vans received a name, now being branded as the Renault Voltigeur and the Renault Goélette. The Goélette, with its 1,400 kg (3,100 lb) weight limit, was now offered with the 2141 cc "Étendard" engine, which featured the same 88mm bore as the 1996 cc but had an 88mm stroke. This engine was also developed for the Renault Frégate, which during its earlier years had failed to win market acceptance mainly because it was underpowered. The 64 PS (47 kW; 63 hp) output when the engine in the van was lower than that produced in the passenger car.

For 1961, buyers could specify a diesel option. The 1816 cc 58 PS (43 kW; 57 hp) diesel unit came from Indenor, a company established by Peugeot to specialise in the design and manufacture of diesel engines. This engine was offered in the Peugeot D4 in 1959. Although diesel powered vehicles were not popular in France, the lower fuel tax rate on diesel fuel made them attractive to buyers. From the middle of 1962, Renault substituted a 2720 cc diesel engine of their own construction producing 61 PS (45 kW; 60 hp).

In 1959 Renault launched the Renault Estafette with a front-wheel drive layout which allowed for a lower floor and much improved space utilisation: the bulkier but in other respects comparable Renault Voltigeur was formally withdrawn in 1963. Production of the Renault Goélette continued until May 1965, when it was replaced by the Renault Super Goélette SG2 range of larger light trucks.

== R 2087 ==
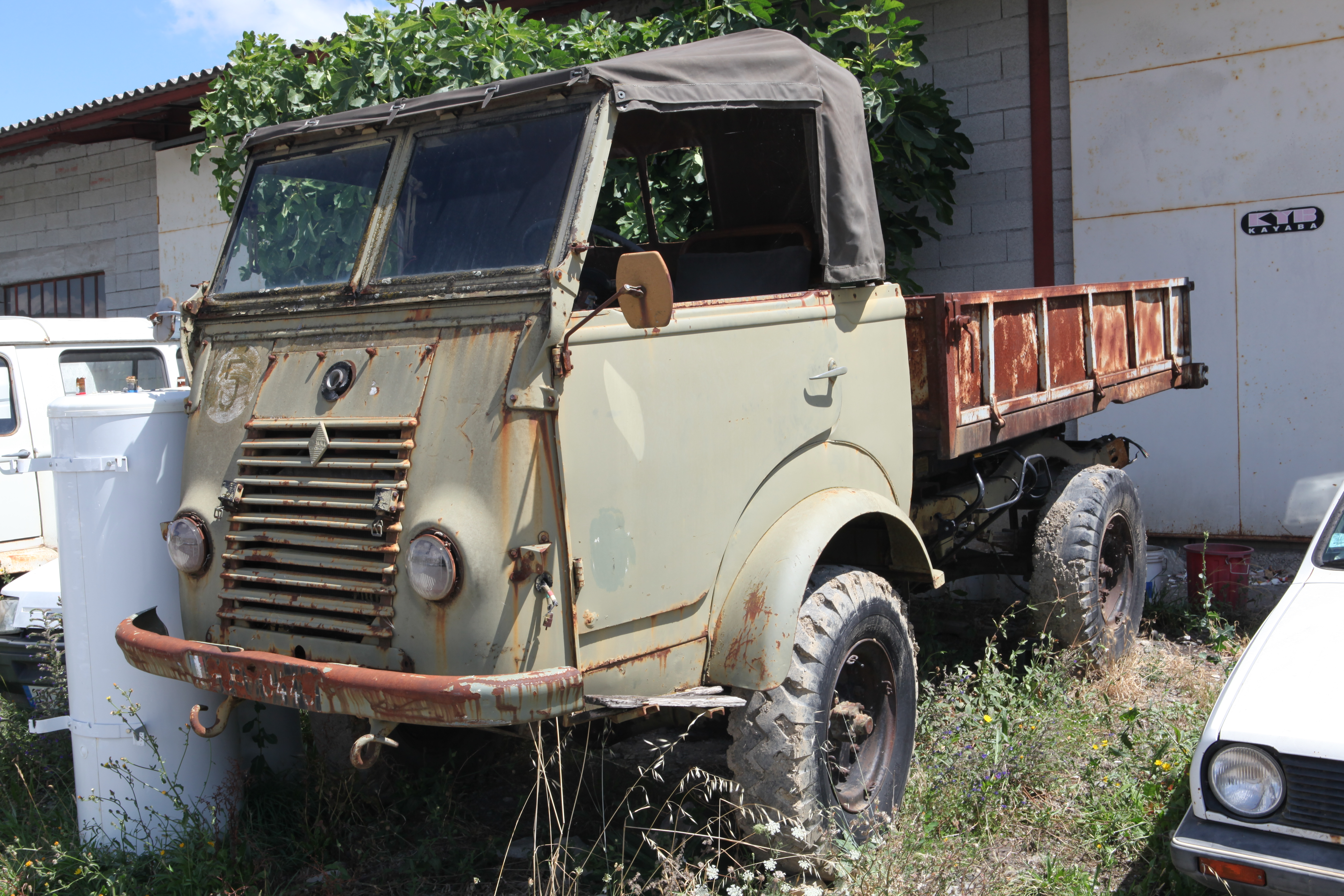
Military R 2087 truck version

The military version of the vehicle was homologated as the R 2087. It came with even greater ground clearance than the standard vehicle and was built, featuring four-wheel drive, in 1952. A variety of vans, with or without extra side-windows, and truck variations was produced. The military ambulance version was produced until 1969, several years after Renault had stopped offering civilian versions of the van.
