= Latil H14 and H16 A1 =

Overview
- Type: Medium-duty/heavy-duty truck
- Manufacturer: Latil; Saviem
- Production: 1948–1960
- Assembly: Suresnes, France

Body and chassis
- Body style: COE
- Layout: Front-engine, rear-wheel drive; Front-engine, all-wheel drive

Powertrain
- Transmission: Manual

Chronology
- Predecessor: Latil H3 A1 B5
- Successor: Saviem JL

The Latil H14 and H16 A1 is a range of medium-duty/heavy-duty trucks with a forward control design for road transport produced by French manufacturer Latil and later Saviem. The Latil H14 and H16 A1 were the last road trucks of Latil origin produced by Saviem. The range was heavily modularised, with standardised pieces and mostly using just a couple of engines throughout its run.

== History and technical details ==
After World War II, the Pons Plan imposed limits to the French commercial vehicle manufacturers, which were divided into various groupings. Latil was made part of a Peugeot-lead grouping, and limited to produce large goods vehicles from 5 to 7 tonnes payload along with Saurer. As a result, in 1947 the company launched its first new road truck after the war, the forward control H3 A1 B5. That year, Latil introduced the H14 diesel engine, a monobloc inline-four engine based on the pre-war H1 which instead had two separated heads for each couple of cylinders. The H14 engine had a 108 mm bore and a 152 mm stroke. The H14 took the direct injection system licensed from Gardner from the H1. An inline-six variant, the H16 ( a H14 with a couple of cylinders added) made its debut shortly afterwards. The first Latil H14 and H16 A1, the H14 A1 B5, appeared in 1948, being a slightly modified H3 A1 B5 with the H14 engine.

In 1950, Latil introduced a new forward control cabin designed by the coachbuilder Aérazur. Its lines were simpler and more modern-looking than the previous design used by Latil. The Latil range of forward control commercial vehicles mostly used just this cabin and the H14 and H16 engines from then on, allowing a strong modularisation and standardisation of components, making it easier for Latil to offer a varied range of low volume models. The most popular product of Latil at the time were tractor units, both rear-wheel drive and all-wheel drive variants.

In 1954, Latil introduced a cabin which could be directly mounted in any chassis without any major modification, and so allowing even more standardisation. The new cabin had a more rounded design and decorative horizontal chromed bars on front. It was criticised for vibrating, having cabin overheating problems and leaving little space inside as the engine occupied a central high position on it.

After Latil was integrated into Saviem, the latter continued producing H14 and H16 A1 models up until 1960, when they were completely replaced by the Saviem JL range.

=== Nomenclature ===
The range is named according to Latil's system introduced shortly before World War II and standardised after it, and it could have up to five code groupings. The first letter/number combination indicates the type of engine according to Latil naming. In the second combination, the A1 indicates a forward control type cabin.

In the third letter/number combination, a B is for a commercial truck with two axles and rear wheel drive in two wheels, the Y for a truck with three axles and rear wheel drive in two wheels, the number along them making reference to truck classes according to Latil. The TL lettering is used mostly for Latil's agricultural and forestry tractors (where it appears immediately after the engine naming, except in a few forward control versions). When used in trucks, it makes reference to all wheel drive, four wheel steering models. TR are four-wheel steering, all-wheel drive heavy machine carriers (most of them unrelated to the Latil H14 and H16 A1 range). TLP and TRP are versions of them with two axles and double rear wheels with only front steering. TLZ and TRZ were versions with three axles.

In the fourth combination appears various letters indicating different uses, such as T (tractor unit), TZ (six axles, all wheel drive tractor unit for government sales), BB and VP (specially-equipped vehicles), S (low chassis). A, B, D and R indicates different gross vehicle weight ratings (R meaning reinforcé, reinforced).

In the fifth grouping appears letters for the chassis length: C (short), N (normal) and L (long).

=== Engines and other specifications ===
By 1953, The H14 (at the time, 5,585 cc) and H16 (8,355 cc) were offered in versions of 80 metric horsepower (59 kW) and 120 metric horsepower (88 kW) respectively. Various models could be fitted with the M14 and M16, two petrol engines similar to the diesel ones. For 1958, a few trucks with the Latil forward control cabin used the D615 H engine from Somua and changed the denomination from H14/H16 to SA1. The D615 H was a 9,350 cc inline-six diesel delivering 150 metric horsepower (110 kW).

The suspension is by leaf springs. The range has air brakes. Most of the H14 and H16 A1 range uses 5-speed manual gearboxes, except for the A1 B3s models (4-speed manual) and the all-wheel drive models (4-speed manual with transfer case, giving 8 speeds).

=== Models ===
The following is an incomplete list of vehicles from the Latil H14 and H16 A1 range:

Model	Wheelbase	gross vehicle weight/gross combined weight	Type
H14 A1 B5	3,270 cm	10.5 tonnes	Truck
H14 A1 B4	2,300—5,000 cm	11 tonnes	Truck
H14 A1 B4 T	2,300 cm	18 tonnes	Tractor unit
H14 A1 B4 T3	2,300 cm	19 tonnes	Tractor unit
H14 A1 B3	2,300–4,450 cm	8.5 tonnes	Truck
H14 A1 B3 S	4,450 cm	9 tonnes	Truck
H14 A1 B6	3,270–5,800 cm	12.5 tonnes	Truck
H14 A1 B6 D	3,270–5,800 cm	12.5 tonnes	Truck
H14 A1 B6 RD	3,270–5,800 cm	13.2 tonnes	Truck
H14 A1 B5 D	3,270–3,850 mm	11 tonnes	Truck
H14 A1 B5 B	3,270–3,850 cm	11.5 tonnes	Truck
H14 A1 TL10	3,050 cm	10 tonnes	4x4 truck
H14 A1 TL10P	3,050–3,700 cm	10 tonnes	4x4 truck
H16 A1 B7 T	3,500 cm	22 tonnes	Tractor unit
H16 A1 B7 T D	3,500 cm	26 tonnes	Tractor unit
H16 A1 B8 A	3,500–5,000 cm	17.5 tonnes	Truck
H14 A1 B8 VP	3,700 cm	18.5 tonnes	Truck
H14 A1 B7 VP	3,700 cm	17 tonnes	Truck
H16 A1 B8 T D/RR	3,500 cm	28–31 tonnes	Tractor unit
H16 A1 TLP	3,700 cm	13 tonnes	4x4 truck
H16 A1 TZ	4,300 cm	11 tonnes	6x6 truck
SA1 (A1) B4 T	2,300 cm	18 tonnes	Tractor unit
SA1 (A1) B8/B8 R	3,500–5,000 cm	18 tonnes	Truck
SA1 (A1) B8 T	3,500 cm	28 tonnes	Tractor unit

Note: The vehicles highlighted with light blue are the last H14 and H16 A1s produced by Saviem in late 1959 and early 1960.
