= Latil TL =

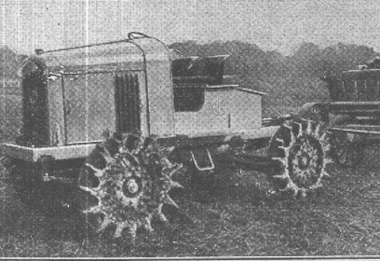

Overview
- Manufacturer: Latil
- Production: 1924–1929
- Assembly: France: Suresnes

Body and chassis
- Layout: Front-engine, four-wheel drive

Chronology
- Successor: Latil KTL

The Latil TL, TL being an initialism (French: tracteur léger, lit. 'light tractor'), is a multipurpose all-wheel drive tractor produced by the French manufacturer Latil.

== History ==
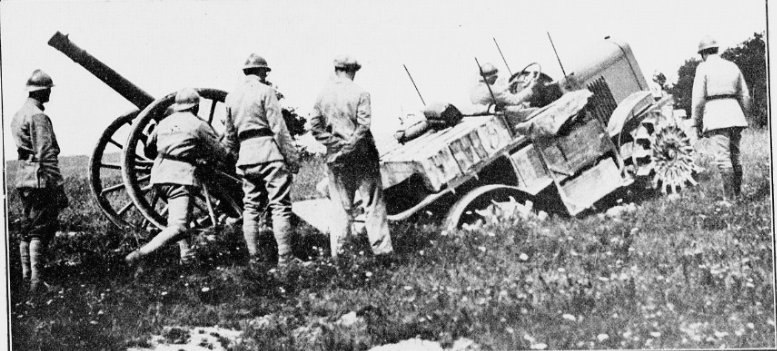
Latil TL with its military bodywork at the 1928 tests.

The TL tractor was introduced in 1924 for forestry, agriculture and "colonial" uses, being unveiled in October of that year at the Paris Salon. In 1925, it was presented in the United Kingdom.

The French military commissioned TLs from 1928 onwards. They were tested as haulers of the 75 mm gun alongside the Citroën Kegresse P7bis, although the Latil model was judged too powerful for that usage. It was finally adopted for hauling the 105 L 13 canon until that, in 1935, it was replaced by the Latil K TL4. As the TL was considered slow for hauling heavy guns, it was reworked as a hauler of rangefinders for anti-aircraft units.

== Technical details ==
The engine is an inline-four petrol unit. It is side valved monobloc with an 85 mm bore and a 130 mm stroke, giving a displacement of 2,950 cc. It delivered 18 PS (18 bhp; 13 kW). Its fiscal power is rated at 14 CV.

The gearbox is a 3-speed manual transmission with a transfer case, giving 6 forward speeds and a reverse. The single-disc clutch and the gearbox are built in one unit with the engine. The differential system can lock the drive on any axle through a lever next to the driver's seat. The tractor has a four-wheel steering system. The wheels have either pneumatic tyres or bare steel, and can be twins on the rear. They could be mounted with retractable spuds for improving grip on some surfaces.

The TL can haul up to 5 tonnes The tractor's wheelbase is 2.25 m (7.4 ft) and its length (main) 4 m (13 ft). Its weight is about 1.8 tonnes. Braking is through a contracting system on the transmission actioned by a pedal and friction brakes on each wheel actioned by a lever. Suspension is by long flat leaf springs.

The military version had a speed of 20 km/h (12 mph).
