= Latil KTL =

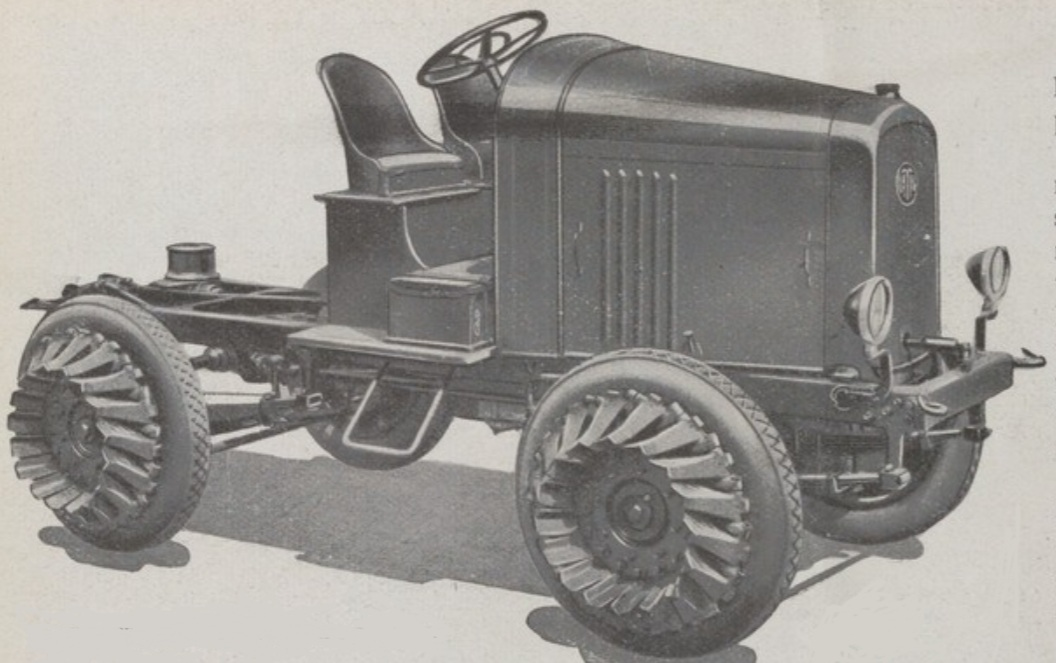

Overview
- Manufacturer: Latil
- Also called: Latil K TL2; Latil K TL4 (extended wheelbase)
- Production: 1929–1938
- Assembly: France: Suresnes; United Kingdom: Letchworth (Shelvoke and Drewry)

Body and chassis
- Layout: Front-engine, four-wheel drive

Chronology
- Predecessor: Latil TL
- Successor: Latil M2 TL6

The Latil KTL is an all-wheel drive tractor produced by the French manufacturer Latil. It was used as a commercial as well as a military tractor.

== History ==
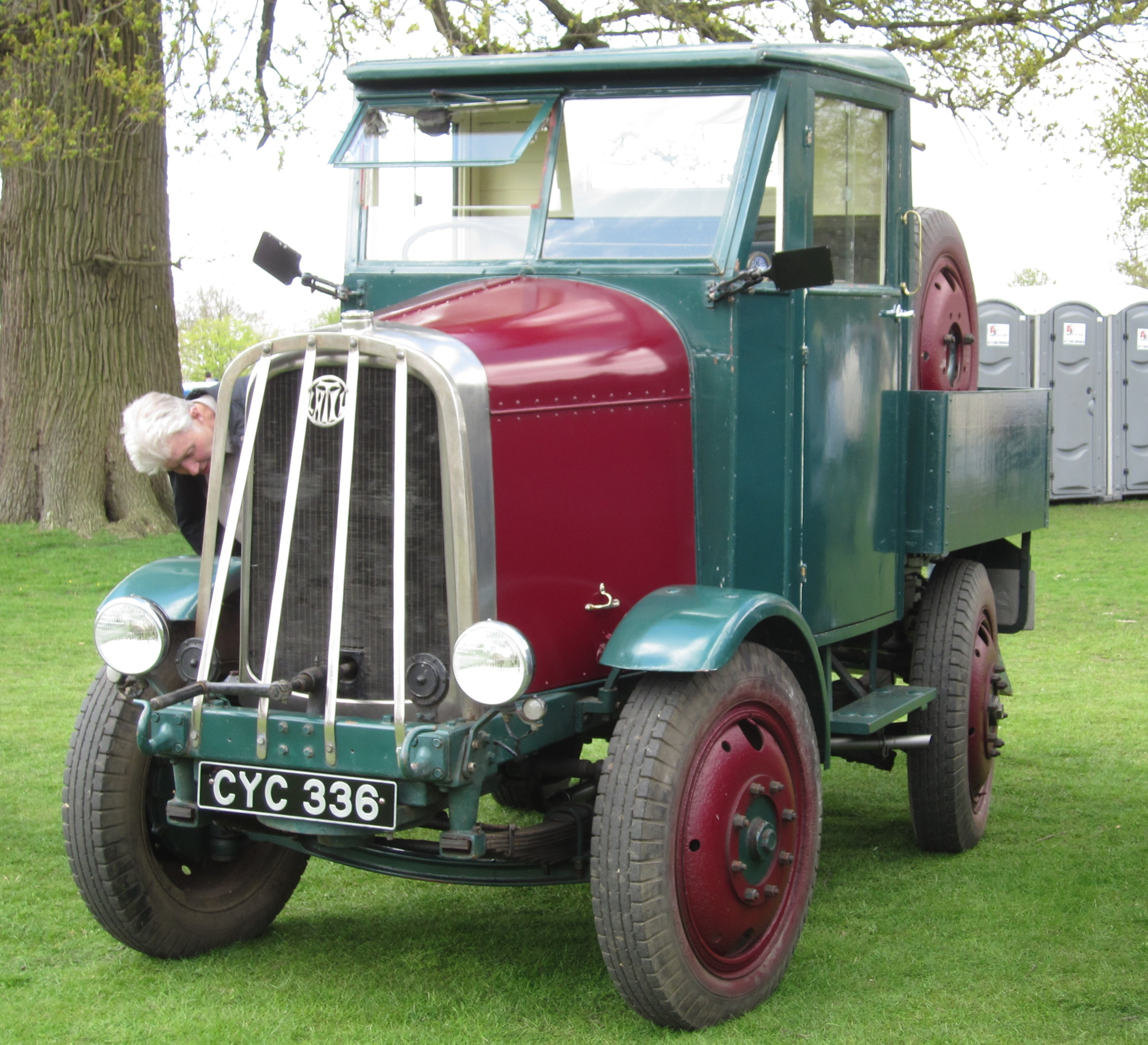
1937 British-assembled KTL for roads with modifications, marketed as Traulier.

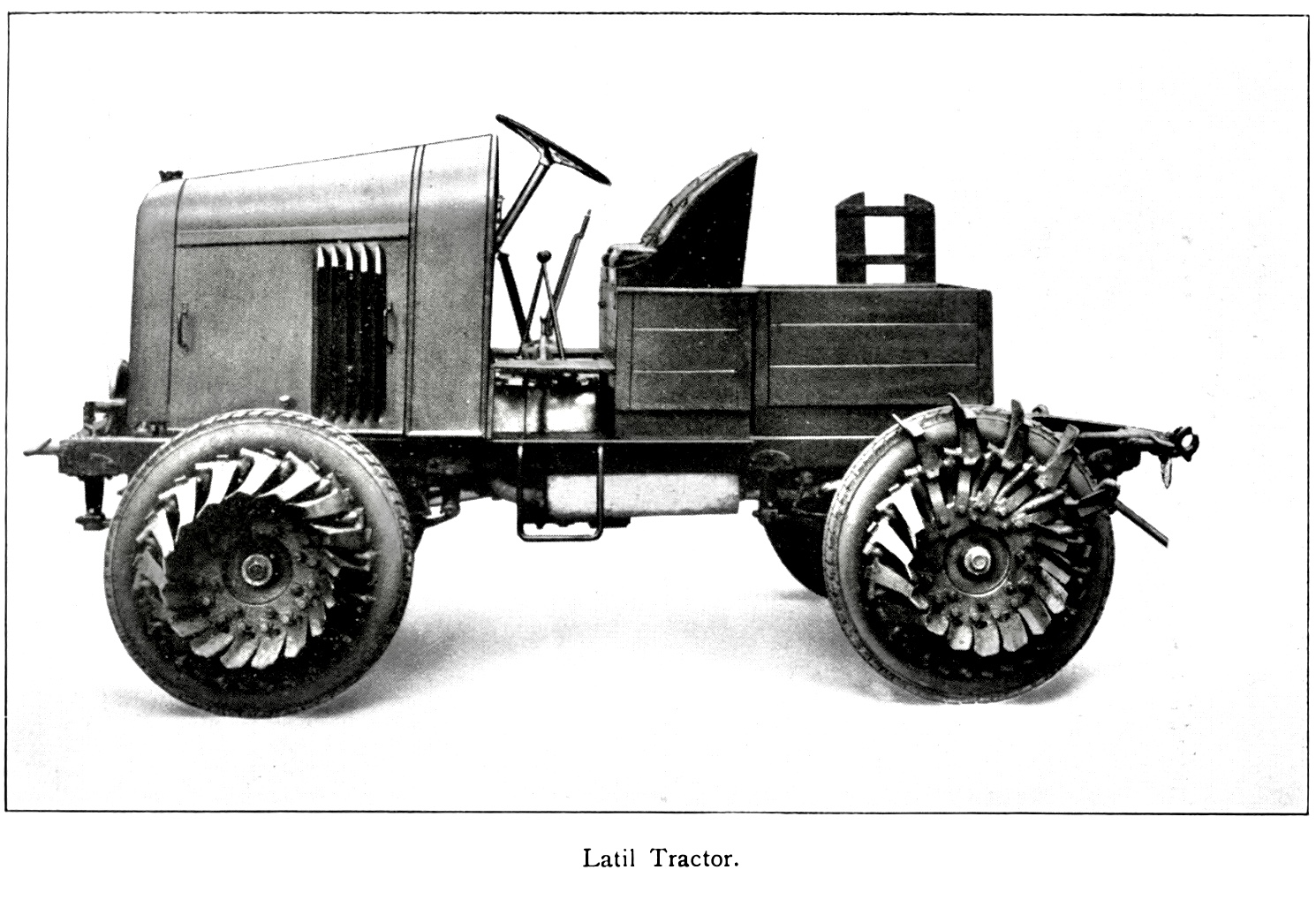
Latil KTL (1929-1938)

The Latil KTL tractor was introduced in 1929. In October of that year, it was presented in the United Kingdom and, by early 1931, it was being imported into the country. By 1932, it started to be assembled locally under licence by the British company Shelvoke and Drewry with some minor modifications.

From 1932 onwards, the KTL was tested by the French military as a replacement for the earlier Latil TL tractor for towing the 105 L 13 canon, as the previous tractor was considered too slow. In 1934, The military finally commissioned the K TL4, a KTL with extended wheelbase, which was still slow for that usage. About 163 were built.

In 1934, another KTL-based vehicle with extended wheelbase, the G TL3 prototype, was tested as a hauler for the 75 CA anti-aircraft gun, but it had a high centre of gravity and a narrow track relative to its wheelbase, which made it lack stability and off-roading capabilities. In 1937, the design was definitively abandoned. The French military adopted another Latil model, the Latil M2 TZ, and various trucks, among them the Berliet GDLS 30.

== Technical details ==
The main engine used for the tractor is the K, an inline-four petrol engine with a 90 mm bore and a 130 mm stroke, giving a displacement of 3,308 cc. Its maximum power is 40 bhp (41 PS; 30 kW) at 1,900 rpm. Its fiscal power is rated at 13 CV. As an optional, the KTL could be equipped with not specified diesel and gasifier-running engines.

The gearbox is a 3-speed manual unit with a transfer case giving 6 forward speeds and 2 reverses. The differential system can lock the drive on any axle through a lever next to the driver's seat. The tractor has a four-wheel steering system. The wheels could be mounted with retractable spuds for improving grip on some surfaces.

For commercial use, the KTL was offered in two versions: agriculture/forestry tractor and road tractor, which mainly differ on bodywork and hauling equipment. They can haul between 5 and 10 tonnes, depending on version. Both have the same dimensions: a (main) length of 3.73 m (12.2 ft) a height (without roof) of 1.941 m (6.37 ft), a width of 1.79 m (5.9 ft), a track of 1.493 m (4.90 ft). The wheels have the same size both on front and rear: 36 in (91 cm) x 6 in (15 cm).

The tractor's wheelbase is 2.3 m (7.5 ft). Its weight (without equipment) is over 2 tonnes. It has drum brakes. Suspension is by long straight leaf springs.

=== K TL4 and G TL3 ===
The K TL4 is a version of the KTL with a wheelbase extended to 2.7 m (8.9 ft). For military use, it was offered in two versions: a tractor for cannon on pivot and an ammunition-carrying tractor with extended bodywork. Both have a length of 4.7 m (15 ft), a height of 2.5 m (8.2 ft) (with roof) and a track of 1.5 m (4.9 ft). They differ in width: the cannon on pivot version is 2.1 m (6.9 ft) and the ammunition-carrying is 2.22 m (7.3 ft). The K engine in military configuration delivered 36 PS (36 bhp; 26 kW). The payload is 950 kg (2,090 lb). The tractor's top speed is 35 km/h.

The G TL3 had a wheelbase of 4.3 m (14 ft).

== Latil JTL ==
The Latil JTL is a similar contemporary tractor with the J engine, an inline-four petrol unit with a 85 mm bore and a 130 mm stroke. Its fiscal power is rated at 11 CV.

The tractor can haul the same as the KTL (5 to 10 tonnes). It was offered with the same variants.
