= Renault EG =

French all-wheel drive truck

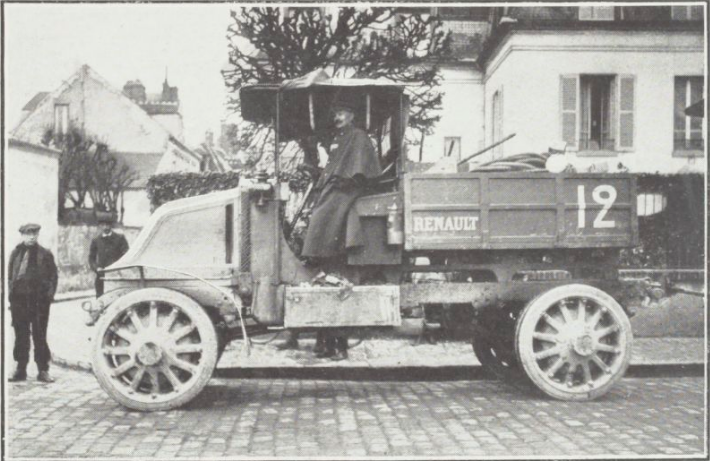
- Early design Renault EG
- Type: Artillery tractor
- Place of origin: France

Service history
- Used by: French Army; American Expeditionary Forces
- Wars: First World War

Production history
- Designed: 1914
- Manufacturer: Renault
- Produced: 1914-1918

Specifications
- Mass: 5.35 t (5.27 long tons; 5.90 short tons) unladen
- Length: 5.6 m (18 ft 4 in) overall 3.63 m (11 ft 11 in) wheelbase
- Crew: 1
- Passengers: 2
- Engine: 8,495 cc (518.4 cu in) Renault G2 4-cylinder inline petrol 50 / 60 hp (37 / 45 kW)
- Drive: Full-time 4x4
- Transmission: 4F1R
- Suspension: Leaf springs front and rear
- References: Key Military

The Renault EG is an all-wheel drive truck/artillery tractor produced between 1914 and 1919 by the French manufacturer Renault.

== History ==
The Renault EG was tested at the 1914 tests for all-terrain vehicles organised by the French military. In 1914, Renault developed a lighter version, the FB, but it was abandoned for concentrating on the EG. During World War I, it was commissioned by the French military. Mass production started in 1915 and about 978 were built by the end of the war. According to François Vauvillier, a total of 1,132 EGs were delivered to the French army. EGs, along with the Berliet CBA, the Latil TAR, the Renaults EP and FU, and the Saurer Type B, were key vehicles of the Voie Sacrée (Holy Road) for supplying the French army during the Battle of Verdun. In March 1924, the French military commissioned more powerful successors of both the Renault EG and the Latil TAR. At tests conducted in 1926, the Renault candidate was not conclusively better than the EG, so the plan to replace it was abandoned. Renault did not produce heavy artillery tractors after that. About 635 EGs were still in service by October 1939, although most of them were destroyed during 1940.

== Technical details ==
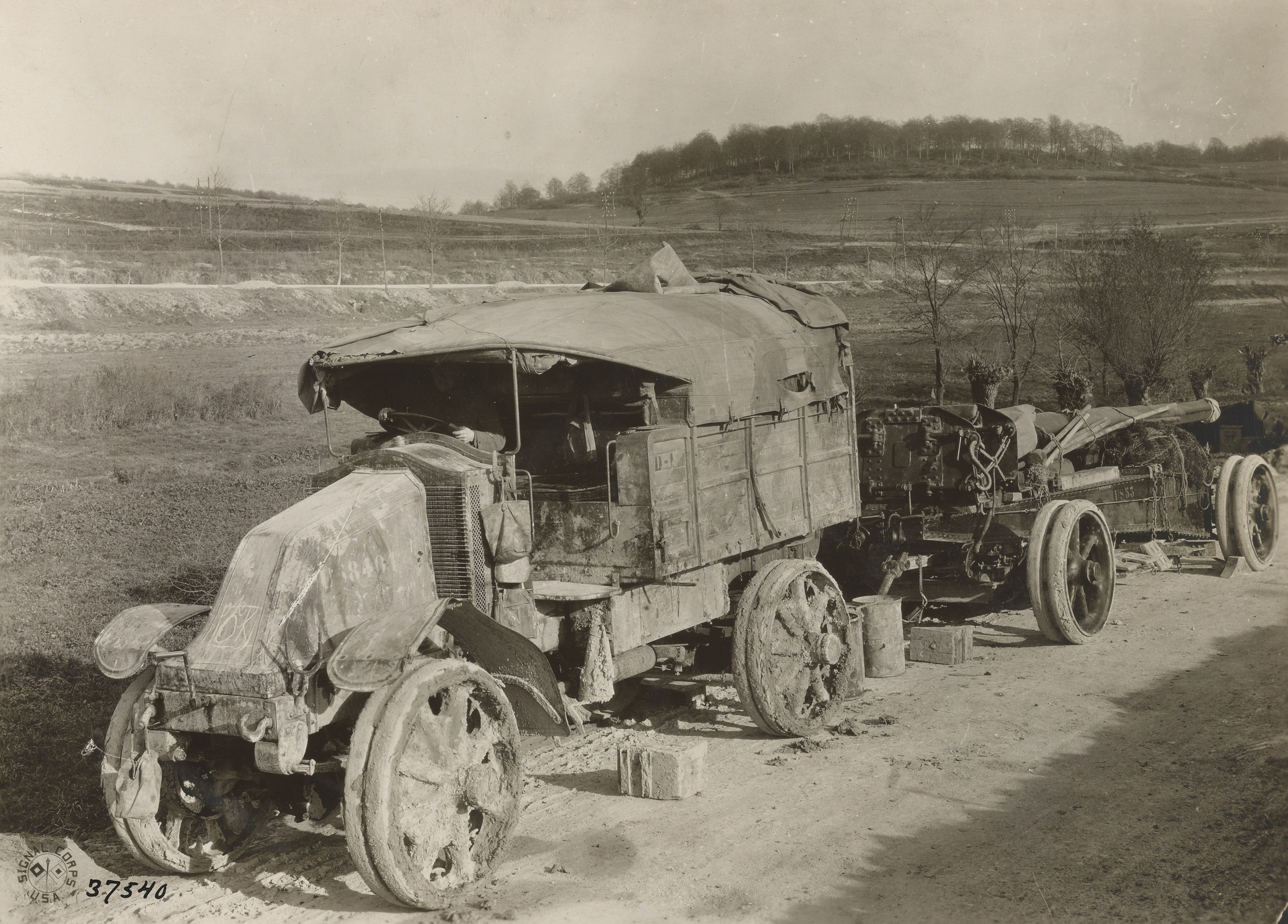
Renault EG used as an artillery tractor by American Expeditionary Forces in France in 1918.

The EG engine is an 8.49-litre inline-four unit producing between 35 metric horsepower (26 kW) at 1,000 rpm and 45 metric horsepower (33 kW) at 1,400 rpm. As other Renaults of that time, the radiator is located behind the engine. In the late 1920s, some EGs were fitted with a more powerful 7.8-litre inline-four engine delivering 57 metric horsepower (42 kW). The EG has a four-wheel steering system by which front and rear wheels are moved independently through two steering gears linked by universal joints to the steering wheel, improving the turning radius. The gearbox is a 4-speed operated through a gear lever. The double wheels are made of cast steel and are of the same diameter (1,000 millimetres (39 in)) both on front and rear. The truck payload is 2,000 kilograms (4,400 lb) and it can haul about 15 tonnes. The wheelbase is 3,600 millimetres (140 in) and the width 1,500 millimetres (59 in).
