= Latil =

Defunct 20th century French automobile manufacturer

Automobiles Industrielles Latil S. A.
- Formerly: Charles Blum & Cie; Charles Blum & Cie S.C.A. (trading as Automobiles Industrielles Latil)
- Type: Limited company
- Industry: Automotive
- Predecessor: Compagnie Française d'Mécanique et d'Automobiles
- Founded: 1909
- Founder: Charles Blum
- Defunct: 1955
- Fate: Merged with Somua and Renault Poids Lourds into Saviem
- Successor: Saviem
- Headquarters: Suresnes, France (from 1914)
- Area served: Western Europe
- Products: Commercial vehicles; Military vehicles
- Owner: Blum family (majority)
- Subsidiaries: S. A. Belge des Automobiles Industrielles Latil (Belgium); Latil Industrial Vehicles Ltd. (United Kingdom)

Automobiles Industrielles Latil, commonly known as Latil, was a French manufacturer of commercial and military vehicles created to manage the assets of the defunct Compagnie Française d'Mécanique et d'Automobiles, to market Georges Latil's avant-train Latil, an early front-wheel drive system. The company was established in 1909 by entrepreneur Charles Blum as Charles Blum & Cie. It started to use Automobiles Industrielles Latil in the 1910s as a trading name. The company started to produce military vehicles by the 1910s and commercial ones in great numbers by the end of World War I. In 1928, the company adopted its trading name as its legal name. It was dissolved in 1955 after being merged into the Saviem group.

== History ==
=== Early years and predecessors ===
In 1898, Georges Latil and Aloïs Korn established an enterprise in Marseille (Korn et Latil) to market a Latil invention, the avant-train Latil, a kit to convert carriages into front-wheel drive vehicles. In 1901, Latil and Korn moved its operations to Levallois-Perret and created the Compagnie Française d'Mécanique et d'Automobiles to sell it in Paris. Despite an initial success, the company was declared bankrupt. By 1905, Charles Blum became an investor and administrator of the company's assets. In 1909, he took over the assets and created a new company called Charles Blum & Cie. to manage them. He kept Georges Latil and his brother Lazare as part of the technical managing team. In June 1912, the company was reorganised as a société en commandite par actions and renamed Charles Blum & Cie S.C.A., later trading as Automobiles Industrielles Latil. That same year, Blum established another company to operate a fleet of vehicles equipped with the avant-train Latil. In 1914, Latil opened a new, larger production plant in Suresnes to replace Levallois-Perret. The Suresnes plant had 20,000 square metres (m^{2}) of covered area in a site of 30,000 m^{2}.

=== World War I and market expansion ===
By 1911, the company started to develop field artillery haulage, for which they created tractors with the layout of a truck. Latil produced one of its first four-wheel, all-terrain vehicle called the TAR, which it sold to the army to use on the Voie Sacrée during World War I to supply troops with 155 mm guns.

After the war, the company also fully entered into the commercial vehicle business, including trucks. In 1924, it unveiled the first of the TL series of four-wheel drive multipurpose tractors.

=== Late interwar years and World War II ===
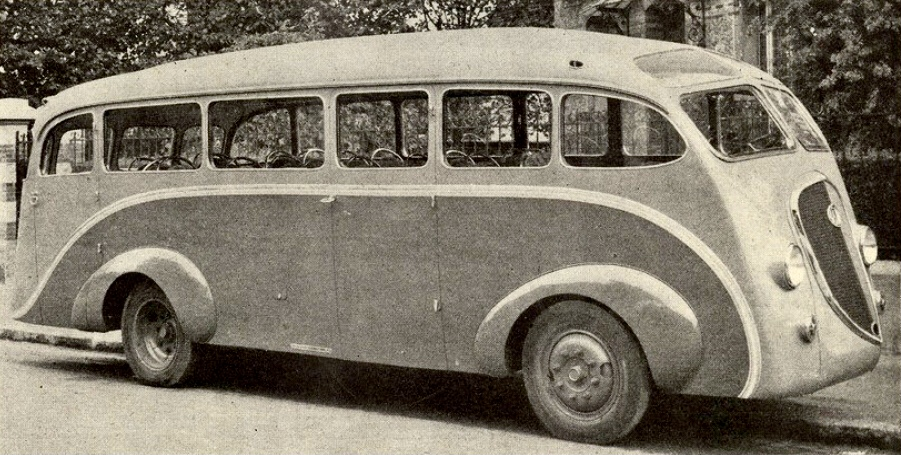
Latil bus

In November 1928, all the Latil group companies were merged into Charles Blum & Cie S.C.A. which became a société anonyme and was renamed as Automobiles Industrielles Latil.

In the 1930s, Latil introduced diesel engines using Gardner licence for direct injection. The company also opened a second plant at Saint-Cloud.

During World War II, it collaborated with the ammunitions company MAP and sold tractors under the name MAP-Latil. After the occupation of France, the Latil plants produced vehicles for the Wehrmacht and only escaped Allied bombing because they were in densely populated areas. In October 1944, Blum, being a French Jew, died exiled in New York.

=== Final years and merger ===
In 1945, the Pons Plan reduced the number of vehicle manufacturers from 28 to seven and Latil was made part of the Peugeot-led grouping.

After World War II, the company found it increasingly difficult to compete with its larger rivals. In 1948, it simplified its forward control range by introducing the H14 and H16 A1s, with a shared cabin, standardised components and using mostly just a couple of engines with Gardner licence.

In 1955, Latil was combined with the heavy vehicles division of Renault and with Somua to form Saviem. The Blum family and other stockholders kept shares in the new company until it became a wholly owned Renault subsidiary in 1959. The Latil truck range was gradually phased out, initially being sold as Latil and then briefly as Saviem-LRS and Saviem.

Following the merging, Latil's TL tractor range was also sold as Latil and then as Saviem. In 1962, the licence for the tractors' production was sold to the Creusot-Loire conglomerate, which marketed them as the Latil Batignolles.

=== Latil in the UK ===
Latil's British subsidiary, Latil Industrial Vehicles Ltd., was established in 1924. Up to 1932, Latil's products were imported from France. From 1932 to either 1937 or 1939, Latil licensed local assembly (mostly Latil's all-wheel drive tractors) to Shelvoke and Drewry. From late 1933 onwards, British-assembled Latil tractors were marketed as Latil Trauliers.

After World War II, Latil's tractors in the UK were partially assembled by US Concessionaires Ltd. The British assembled tractors usually changed the original engines for local ones, mostly Meadows units.

== Products ==
=== Commercial vehicles ===
Chassis	Variants	Engines			Payload	Gearboxes	Wheelbase	Type	Production
Chassis	Variants	Fuel	C.	Bore and stroke	Payload	Gearboxes	Wheelbase	Type	Production
B	B1 (lighter version); B2 (heavier version); B2T (tractor unit)	Petrol	I4	85 mm x 130 mm	1.5 tonnes (B1); 2 tonnes (B2); 5 tonnes (hauling) (B2T)	4-speed manual	3,500—3,900 cm	Light truck and bus/coach	1922–1930
VL◇	VL1 (lighter version); VL2 (medium version); VL3 (heavier version)	Petrol	I4	105 mm x 140 mm	1 tonne (VL1); 2 tonnes (VL2); 3 tonnes (VL3)	4-speed manual	3,500–4,424 cm	Transit bus and delivery truck	1919–1924
NVL◇	NVL2 (lighter version); NVL3 (heavier version); NVL2/3 S (low chassis)	Petrol	I4	105 mm x 140 mm	2 tonnes (NVL2); 3 tonnes (NVL3)	4-speed manual	3,500–4,424 cm	Transit bus and delivery truck	1925–1930
P◇	?	Petrol	I4	105 mm x 140 mm	3–4 tonnes	4-speed manual	?	Truck	1919–1924
NP◇	NP (lighter version); NP3 (heavier version); NTP (4x4 tractor unit)	Petrol	I4	105 mm x 140 mm	3 tonnes (NP); 4 tonnes (NP3); 10 tonnes (hauling) (NTP)	4-speed manual	3,500–3,900 cm	Truck	1925–1930
B5	B5 (normal); B5S (low chassis); B5T (tractor unit)	Petrol	I4	105 mm x 140 mm	5 tonnes; 10 tonnes (hauling)	4-speed manual	4,100–5,140 cm	Truck and bus/coach	1925–1936
PB	-	Petrol	I4	85 mm x 130 mm	1.8 tonnes	4-speed manual	3,412 cm	Light truck and bus/coach	1931–1933
PBb	PB2 (lighter version); PB3/PB3D (heavier version); PB3-TRB2 (tractor unit)	Petrol	I4	90 mm x 130 mm	2 tonnes (PB2); 3 tonnes (PB3); 6 tonnes (hauling) (PB3-TRB2)	4-speed manual	2,430–4,280 cm	Truck and bus/coach	1931–1935
GPB	GPB; GPB2; GPB3; GPBS (low chassis); GPB3T/GPB3T-PR26 (tractor unit)	Petrol	I4	100 mm x 130 mm	1.8 tonnes (GPB); 2 tonnes (GPB2); 3 tonnes (GPB3); 6–7 tonnes (hauling) (GPB3T/GPB3T-PR26)	4-speed manual	2,430–4,280 cm	Truck and bus/coach	1931–1937
SPB	SPB3 (normal); SPB3S (low chassis); SPB3T-RAB10/SPB3-RAY10 (tractor unit)	Petrol	I4	105 mm x 160 mm	3–4 tonnes; 10 tonnes (hauling)	4-speed manual	2,665–4,400 cm	Truck and bus/coach	1931–1935
FY10	-	Petrol	I4	110 mm x 160 mm	10 tonnes	4-speed manual	5,530 cm	6x2 truck	1932–1934
FB6	-	Petrol	I4	110 mm x 160 mm	6 tonnes; 10 tonnes (hauling)	4-speed manual	4,100–5,140 cm	Truck	1934–1939
PB10	-	Petrol	I4	110 mm x 160 mm	10 tonnes	4-speed manual	3,800 cm	Truck	1932–1933
V3	V3 B8 (normal); V3 Y10 (6x2 truck); V3 TU (6x2 military truck); V3 A B3 (bus/coach)	Petrol	V8	100 mm x 115 mm	8 tonnes; 10 tonnes	4-speed manual	4,710–5,517 cm	4x2/6x2 truck and 4x2 bus/coach	1932–1938
M	M1B (lighter); M1B1 (heavier)	Petrol	I4	75 mm x 120 mm	1.2 tonnes (M1B); 2.5 tonnes (M1B1)	4-speed manual	3,350–3,410 cm	Light truck and bus/coach	1934–1939
Mb	M2B1 (light); M2B3 (medium); M2B4 (heavier)	Petrol	I4	100 mm x 130 mm	1 tonne (M2B1); 3 tonnes (M2B3); 4 tonnes (M2B4)	4-speed manual	3,410–4,750 cm	Truck	1935–1942
H4B1	-	Diesel	I4	95 mm x 133 mm	2 tonnes	4-speed manual	3,410 cm	Light truck	1935–1940
H1B6	-	Diesel	I4	108 mm x 152 mm	6 tonnes; 10 tonnes (hauling)	4-speed manual	4,100–5,140 cm	Truck	1934–1939
H1 A1 B6☆	-	Diesel	I4	108 mm x 152 mm	6 tonnes	4-speed manual	4,940 cm	Truck	1936–1939
H1 A B3	-	Diesel	I4	108 mm x 152 mm	3 tonnes	4-speed manual	4,710–5,517 cm	Bus/coach	1937–1939
H2B8	-	Diesel	I6	108 mm x 152 mm	8 tonnes	4-speed manual	4,100–5,140 cm	Truck	1934–1943
H2 A1 Y10☆	-	Diesel	I6	108 mm x 152 mm	10 tonnes	4-speed manual	5,325 cm	6x2 truck	1937–1948
H2 A1 B8☆	-	Diesel	I6	108 mm x 152 mm	8 tonnes	4-speed manual	3,890–4,950 cm	Truck	1937–1948
H1 A1 B4/B4T☆	-	Diesel	I4	108 mm x 152 mm	4 tonnes; 11 tonnes (hauling)	5-speed manual	2,300–4,880 cm	Truck	1939–1948
H3 A1 B5☆	-	Diesel	I4	108 mm x 152 mm	5 tonnes	5-speed manual	3,270 cm	Truck	1947–1948
Latil H14 and H16 A1☆	-	Diesel	I4; I6	108 mm x 152 mm	Various	4-speed manual; 5-speed manual	Various	Truck	1948–1960
H12 B10 T	-	Diesel	I6	116 mm x 152 mm	30 tonnes (hauling)	4-speed manual	4,165 cm	Truck	1950–1957
Notes
Some vehicles equipped with the avant-train Latil were used for commercial purposes before World War I; Vehicles marked with a (◇) have front-wheel drive, unless otherwise indicated. The rest are rear-wheel drive; Vehicles marked with a (☆) are forward control, the rest are conventional; From the late 1920s and up to the early 1930s, a few chassis could be equipped with inline-two diesel engines supplied by the Compagnie lilloise de moteurs.; From the early 1930s, some chassis primarily powered by H Gardner-type diesel engines could mount optional M or F type petrol engines developed by Latil.; In low volumes, various vehicles used alternative fuels apart from petrol or diesel.

=== Tractors and military vehicles ===
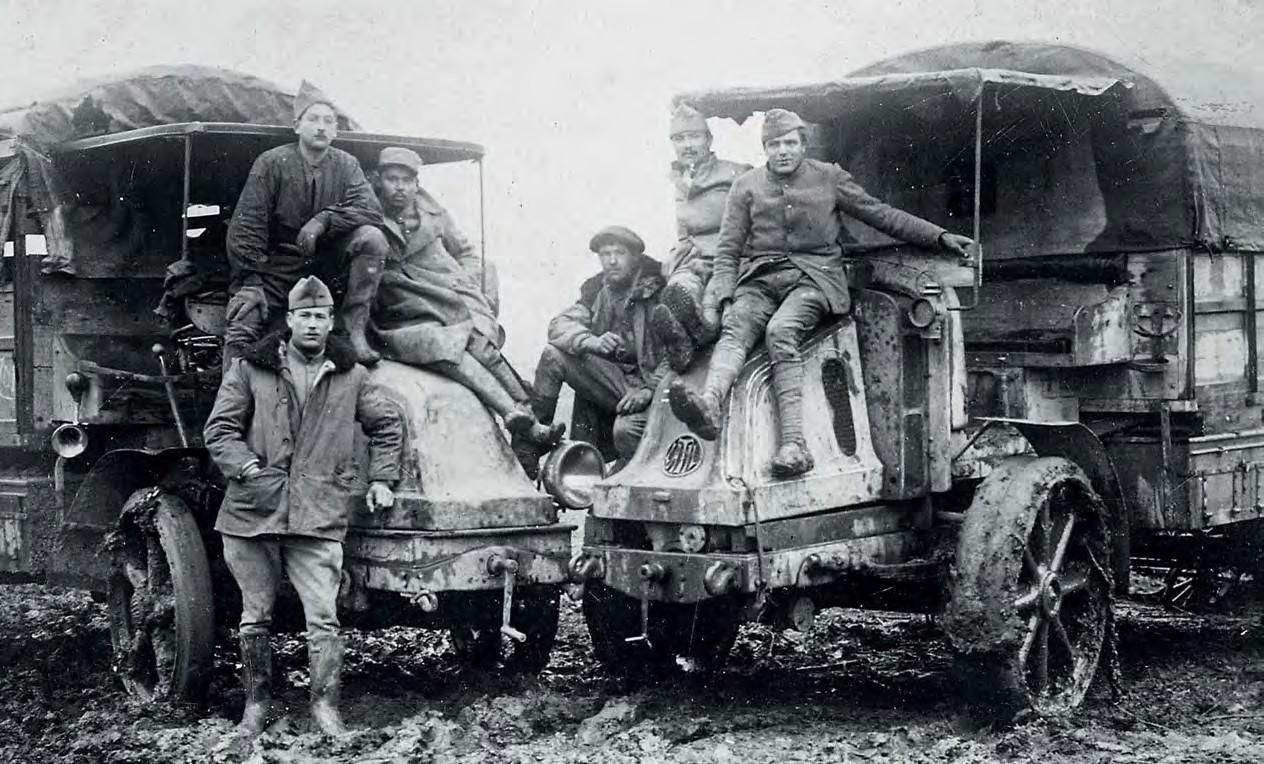
Latil TP (left) and TAR (right) showing the difference in size between the two

==== 1911–1928 ====
- TI (light tractor)
- U (light tractor)
- TP (cargo tractor, 4x4 commercial truck, armoured truck)
- TH (heavy artillery tractor, commercial tractor/truck)
- TAR ( heavy artillery tractor, commercial tractor)
- TAR 2
- TAR 3
- Tourand-Latil (self-propelled plow/tractor)
- TL (agricultural and forestry tractor, hauler tractor, medium artillery tractor, rangefinding for anti-aircraft units hauler)

==== 1928–1945 ====
- F SPB4 (military truck)
- TAR 4
- TAR 5
- F TAR
- AMD Latil (prototype scouting armoured car)
- TAR H1 (heavy tractor prototype)
- JTL (agricultural and forestry tractor, hauler tractor)
- KTL (agricultural and forestry tractor, hauler tractor, medium artillery tractor)
- GTL (prototype artillery tractor)
- M7 T1 (light infantry, liaison and reconnaissance tractor)
- M7 Z1 (light artillery tractor)
- M2 TL6/M3 TL6/H4 TL6 (multipurpose tractor, military tractor)
- M2 TZ (medium artillery and military transport tractor)
- N (chenillette tractor)
- TAR H2 (heavy artillery and workshop tractor)
- M2 TX (prototype heavy workshop tractor)
- MAN AS250 (German MAN agricultural tractor assembled by Latil from 1943 onwards, as MAN focused exclusively on military vehicles. After the war, it was briefly marketed as Latil AS250)
- TL7-RR (rail/route tractor)

==== 1945–1955 ====
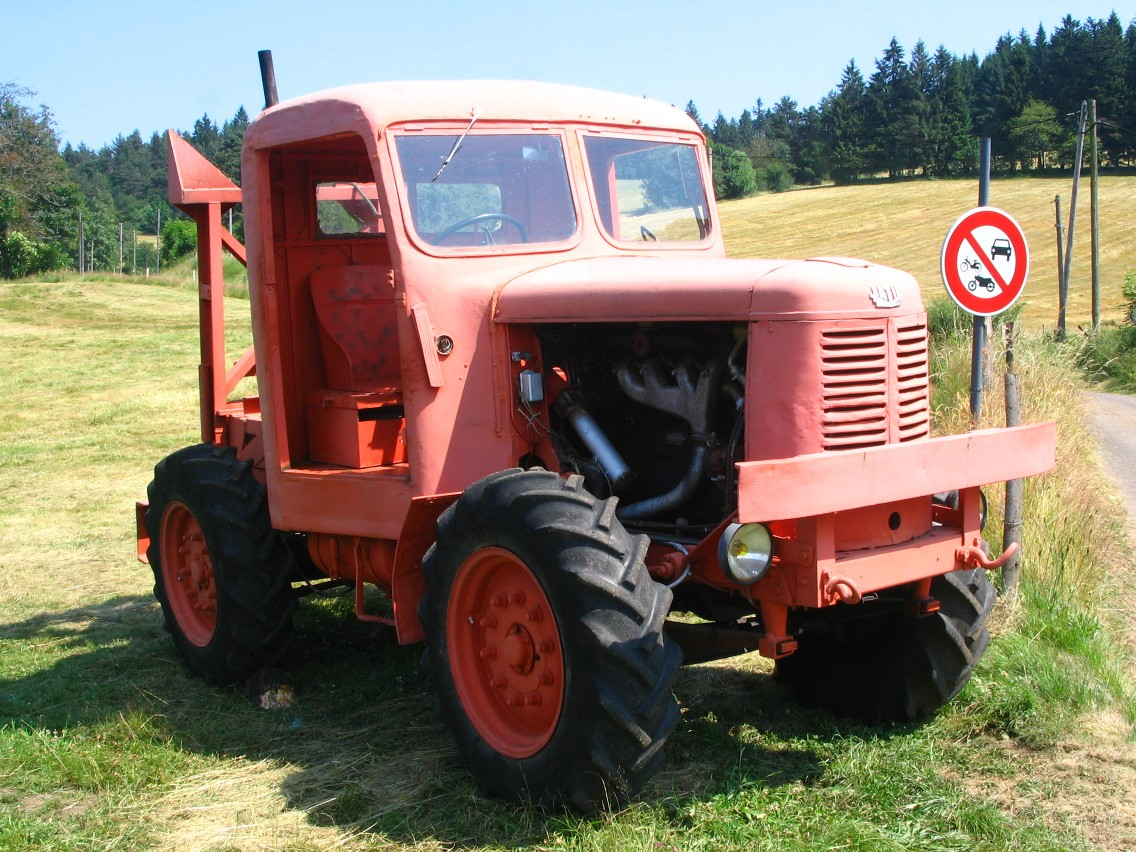
Latil H14 TL10

- H4 TL9 (agricultural and forestry tractor)
- H14 TL10/H11 TL10 (agricultural and forestry tractor,multipurpose tractor)
- M17 T1 (prototype light truck and staff vehicle)
- M18 T2 (4x4 military truck)
- TRPZ (6×4/6x6 tractor/truck)
