= Latil H14 TL10 =

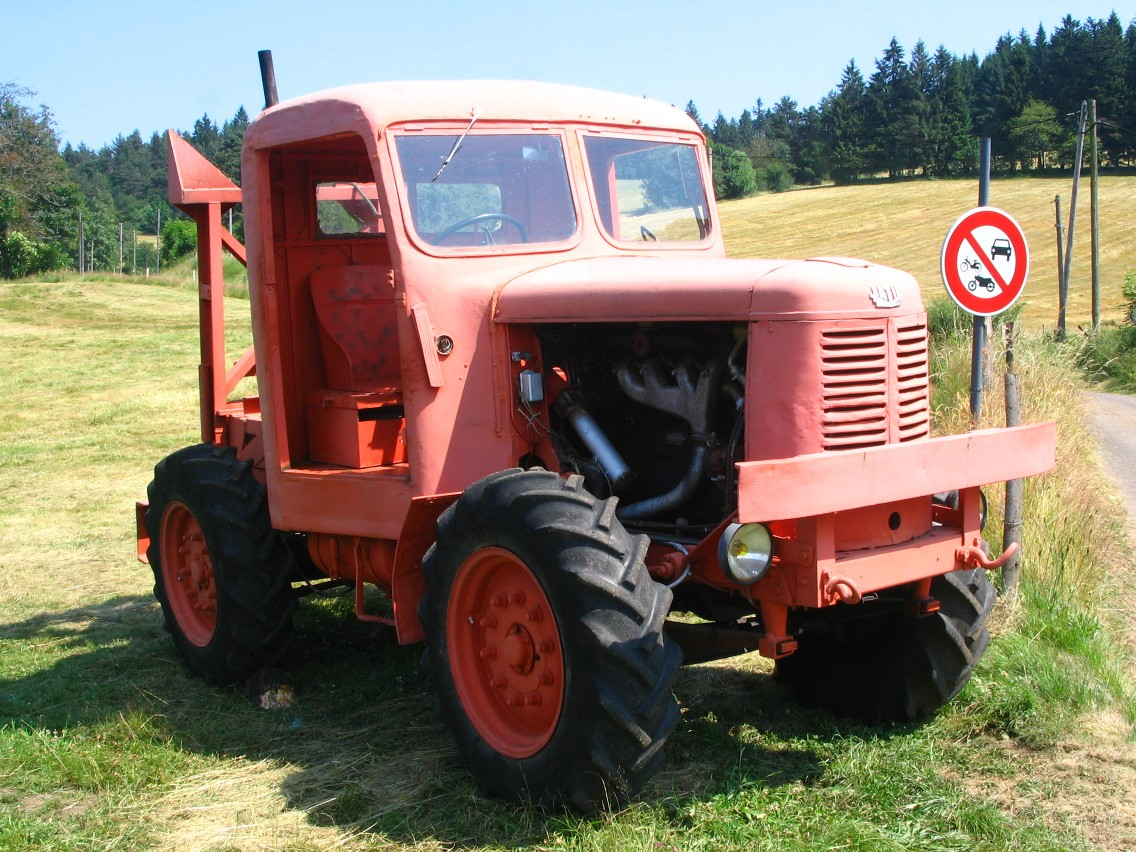

Overview
- Manufacturer: Latil; Saviem
- Also called: Latil H11 TL10 (British variant); Saviem H14 TL12R (Saviem variant); Saviem H14 TL12 (simplified variant); Saviem TL20 (simplified variant)
- Production: 1947–1962
- Assembly: Suresnes, France; Ascot, England (partial)

Body and chassis
- Layout: Front-engine, four-wheel drive

Chronology
- Predecessor: Latil H4 TL9
- Successor: Saviem TL21/22/23

The Latil H14 TL10 is an all-wheel drive agricultural and forestry tractor produced by Latil and later Saviem from 1947 to 1962 through various evolutions. It was replaced by the Saviem TL21/22/23 range.

== History ==
In 1947, Latil unveiled its H14 TL10 agricultural and forestry tractor, mounting the H14 engine, a slightly modified H1. By 1949, it was sold in the United Kingdom as a multipurpose tractor (adding tractor unit for road and off-road) with the name H11 TL10.

In the 1950s, TL10s equipped with a winch had some military use by engineering corps of the French Army.

In 1957, after Latil was integrated into the Saviem company, a minor evolution of the TL10, the H14 TL12R, was introduced. In December 1960, the company unveiled the H14 TL12, a cheaper variant of the TL12R without trailer brake (which meant it could only be used as a towing tractor and not as an agricultural one).

== Technical details ==
The main engine used for the tractor is the H14, an evolution of the pre-World War II H1 with a direct injection system licensed from Gardner. It is a inline-four diesel engine with a 108 mm bore and a 152 mm stroke, giving a displacement of 5,585 cc (earlier version) and 5,569 cc (later version). Its power was between 65 PS (64 bhp; 48 kW) at 1,500 rpm (earlier version) and 85 PS (84 bhp; 63 kW) at 1,850 rpm (later version). As an optional, earlier TL10 versions could be equipped with a similar petrol engine codenamed as M14.

The British version had a different engine codenamed as H11 by Latil and supplied by Meadows, the 4 DC-420. It is an inline four diesel with a bore and stroke of 130 mm, giving a displacement of 6,902 cc. Maximum engine power was 70 bhp (71 PS; 52 kW) at 1,900 rpm and its torque 233 lb⋅ft (316 N⋅m) at 1,000 rpm.

The gearbox is a 4-speed unit with a transfer case giving 8 forward speeds and 2 reverses. The gearbox output shaft is connected to the front and rear axles, making the tractor on permanent four-wheel drive. Levers in the cabin are connected to the differential system to lock the drive on any axle.

The tractor has a four-wheel steering system, with the steering drop arm connected to the stub assemblies of both axles, giving it a turning radius of 15 ft (4.6 m). The H14 TL10 and the H14 TL12R were available in a "navette" version, with a panoramic cabin, double driving positions with two vertical steering wheels and reversed gears.

The tractor's wheelbase is 2.4 m (7.9 ft) and it weighs over 3 tonnes. It has air brakes. Suspension is by straight leaf springs.

== Later developments ==
As the company marketed the H14 TL12, it also introduced the TL20, a simpler version with mechanical instead of air brakes, a 3-speed instead of four-speed gearbox, and a redesigned grille.

In October 1961, Saviem unveiled a new range of tractors with various design changes: the TL21, TL22, and TL23. The TL21 was an agricultural and forestry tractor, the TL22 a towing tractor and the TL23 a prime mover of 24 tones gross combined weight. The first has mechanical braking and the others air braking. All of them are powered by the F 120.51 Fulgur engine, an inline-four diesel engine with a 110 mm bore and a 120 mm stroke, giving a displacement of 4,561 cc. The maximum power of it was 100 PS (99 bhp; 74 kW) at 2,500 rpm.

In 1962, the licence for the tractors' production was sold to the Creusot-Loire conglomerate, which marketed them as the Latil Batignolles.
