= Latil TAR =

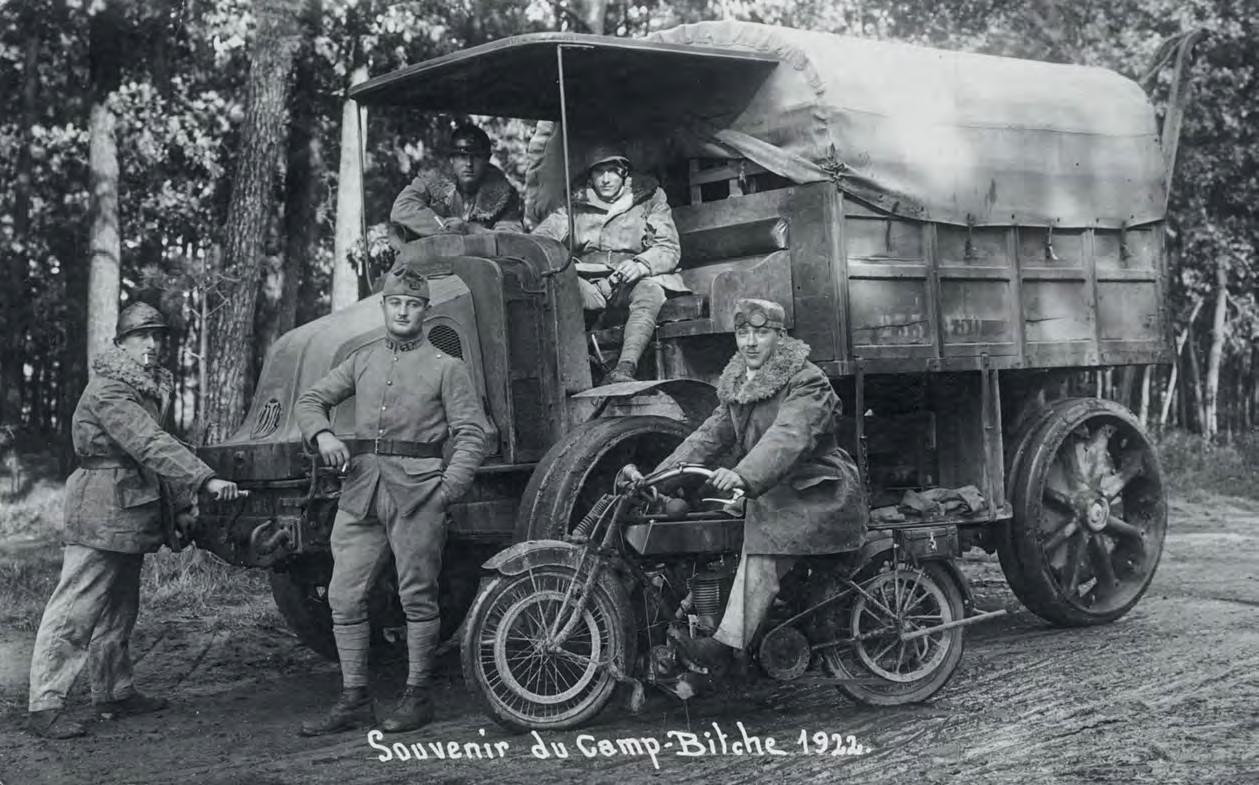
- Latil TAR and BSA Model K motorcycle at a French training ground, Bitche, 1922.
- Type: Artillery tractor, heavy equipment transporter & portée
- Place of origin: France

Service history
- In service: 1914–early 1940s
- Used by: French Army; American Expeditionary Forces; Wehrmacht
- Wars: First World War; Second World War

Production history
- Designed: 1913
- Manufacturer: Charles Blum & Cie S.C.A. later Automobiles Industriels Latil
- Produced: 1913–1922

Specifications (Artillery tractor variant)
- Mass: 5.8 t (5.7 long tons; 6.4 short tons) unladen
- Length: 5.55 m (18 ft 3 in); 3 m (9 ft 10 in) wheelbase
- Engine: 4,200 cc (260 cu in) 4-cylinder inline petrol 32 hp (24 kW) at 1,200 rpm
- Drive: Full-time 4x4
- Transmission: 5F1R
- Suspension: None
- Maximum speed: 10 km/h (6.2 mph)
- References: Illustrated Guide to Military Vehicles

The Latil TAR (Tracteur d’Artillerie Roulante) was a French artillery tractor built by the firm Latil. It saw widespread service with the French Army during the First World War in its intended role as an artillery tractor, as well as a heavy equipment transporter.

== Design ==
The TAR featured constant four-wheel drive and four-wheel steering; all four wheels were twinned with solid tyres. Due to the radiator being mounted behind the engine, its appearance was somewhat similar to the Mack AC or Renault EG.

The TAR was powered by a 4,200 cc (260 cu in) inline four-cylinder side-valve petrol engine that developed 32 hp (24 kW) at 1,200 rpm. It was driven through a five-speed transmission, with separate drive shafts to each wheel.

The TAR was usually equipped with a heavy winch at the rear.

== History ==
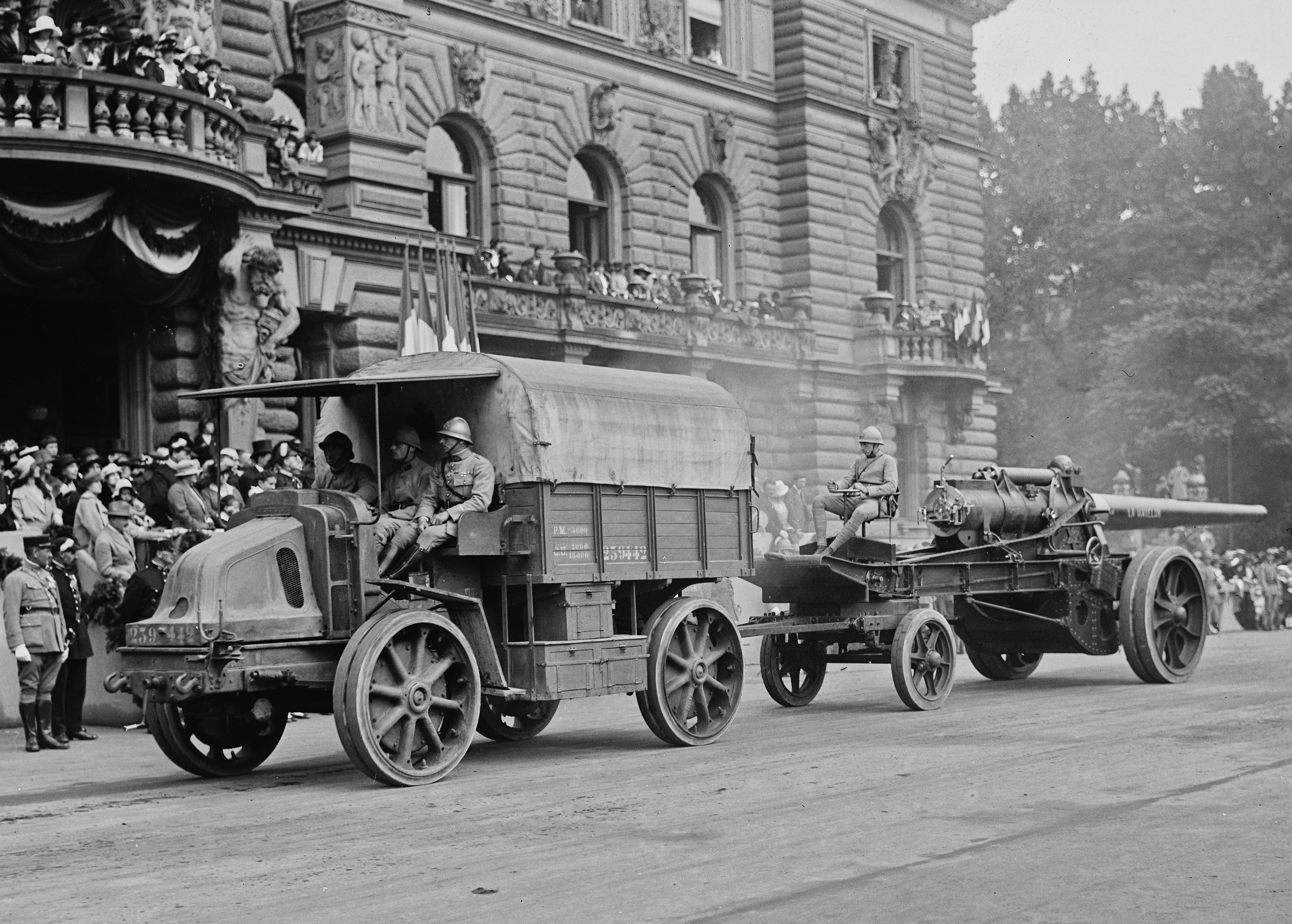
Latil TAR towing a 145 L 16, Strasbourg, 1922

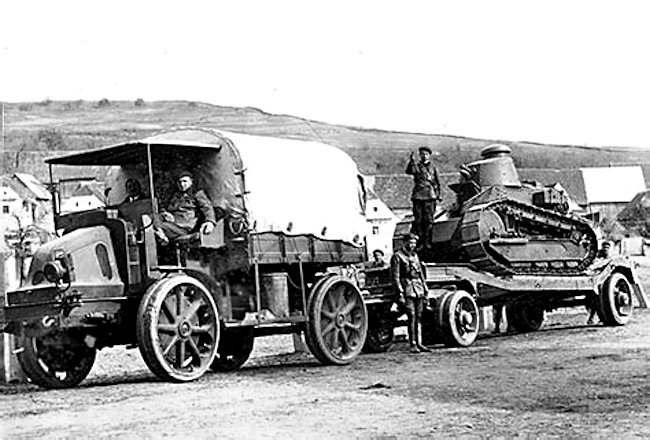
French Army TAR towing a trailer with a Renault FT tank

The Latil TAR artillery tractor was used by the French Army during the First World War to tow heavy artillery pieces such as the Canon de 155 mm GPF, Canon de 220 L mle 1917 and Mortier de 280 modèle 1914 Schneider. 1,997 TAR artillery tractors were in the service of the French Army at the end of the First World War, and they continued to serve into the 1930s. A number also were also supplied to the American Expeditionary Forces during the First World War.

From October 1915 tests were carried out on Latil TARs equipped with four Delahaye track units in place of their wheels. Initial tests revealed the vehicle could tow 38 t (37 long tons; 42 short tons) on a flat surface, or 21 t (21 long tons; 23 short tons) on a 14° incline. But the system was found to have a number of limitations, and it never entered service.

In 1917 a heavy equipment transporter version of the Latil TAR was developed, towing an 8 t (7.87 long tons; 8.82 short tons) trailer. It was found that the French Army's tracked artillery tractors, such as the Holts and the Schneiders, were too slow and prone to breakdowns for longer road runs, so the equipment transporter version was developed to permit more rapid redeployment. In service, the system was found to be effective to move both tracked tractors and occasionally tanks. However, the trailers were never available in sufficient numbers - only 66 had been built by the war's end.

A portée version of the Latil TAR was developed featuring smaller wheels and a platform body and ramps; it was used to carry the Canon de 75 modèle 1897. The version supplemented and later partially replaced the French Army's Jeffery Quad portées in their portée regiments.

Despite having largely been replaced by the Latil TAR-H in the 1930s, a small number of TARs were still in French service at the beginning of the Second World War when they were captured by the invading Germans and subsequently employed by the Wehrmacht.

== Latil TAR-H ==
The Latil TAR was progressively developed through the 1920s and 1930s. The radiator was moved in front of the engine in the TAR-2 and the cabin was enclosed in the TAR-5. The final version in French service was the TAR-H, which was the standard French heavy artillery tractor at the beginning of the Second World War. A much heavier vehicle than the original, it featured a squared off bonnet and a steel frame, and it was known for its good performance. A large number of these were captured Germans and subsequently pressed into Wehrmacht service.

== See also ==
- Renault EG
- FWD Model B
