= Korn et Latil =

French company

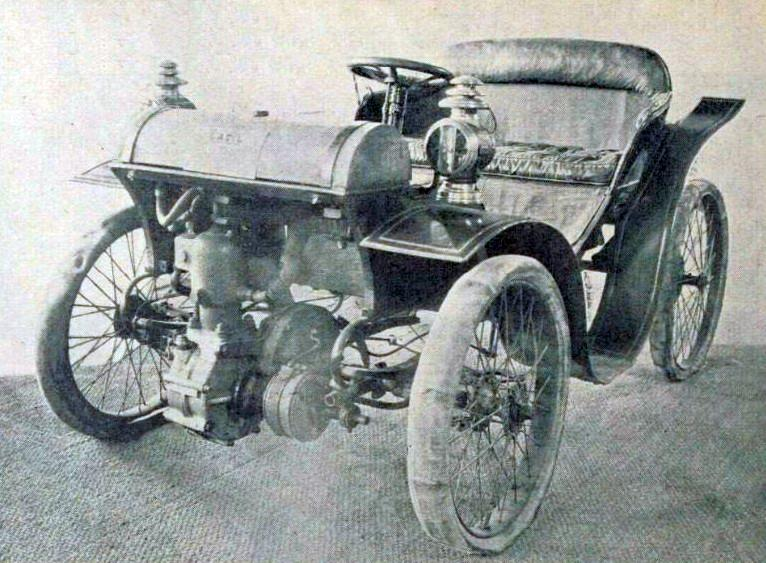
Korn et Latil

Korn et Latil was a French automobile manufacturer established in 1898 at Marsaille. In 1909, after moving to Levallois-Perret being reincorporated and later bankrupt, it was succeeded by Latil.

== History ==
In 1897, Auguste Joseph Frederic Georges Latil (1878–1961) patented a constant-velocity joint, inspired by the knee's patella and which allowed wheels used for steering to also be used for driving, now known as front-wheel drive. This unit (the avant-trail Latil) could be attached to the front of horse-drawn vehicles.

Latil and his friend, mechanic Aloïs Korn, started the Korn et Latil Company in Marseille in 1898. Latil patented the design for the front-wheel drive.

The company produced a front-wheel drive voiturette with a 3.5 metric horsepower (2.6 kW) Aster engine. It was designed by Latil.

In 1901, Latil and Korn moved its operations to Levallois-Perret and created the Compagnie Française d'Mecánique et d'Automobiles company to sell the avant-trail Latil in Paris. Despite an initial success, the company was declared bankrupt. By 1905, Charles Blum became an investor and administrator of the company's assets. In 1909, he took over the assets and created a new company called Charles Blum & Cie to manage them.
