= Mack F series =

Overview
- Manufacturer: Mack Trucks
- Production: 1962–1981

Body and chassis
- Class: Truck
- Body style: Cab over engine

Powertrain
- Transmission: Mack (manual)

Chronology
- Predecessor: Mack H series
- Successor: Mack Cruise-Liner (Created 1975)

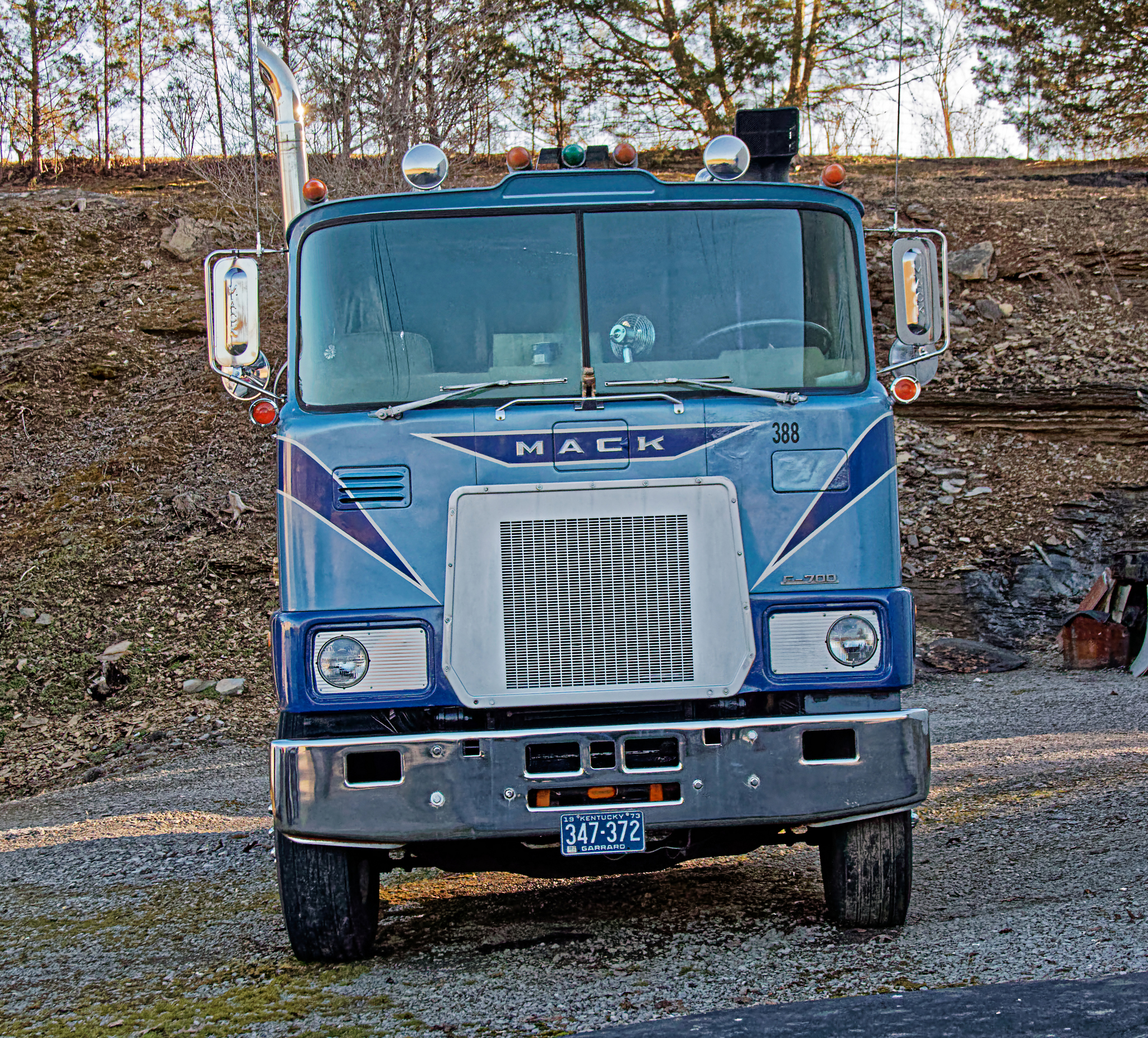
1976 Mack F-700 in Kentucky

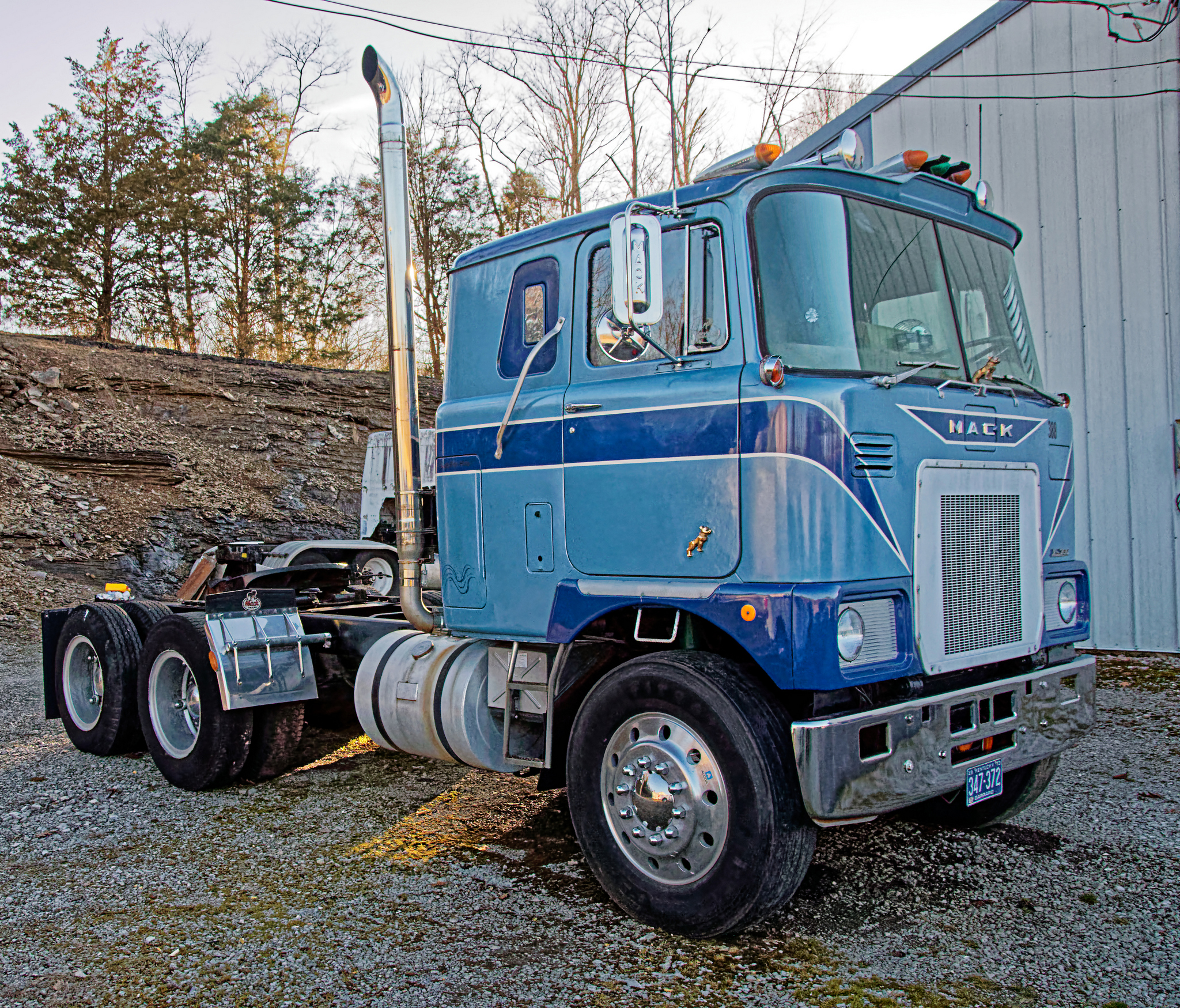
1976 Mack F-700 in Kentucky

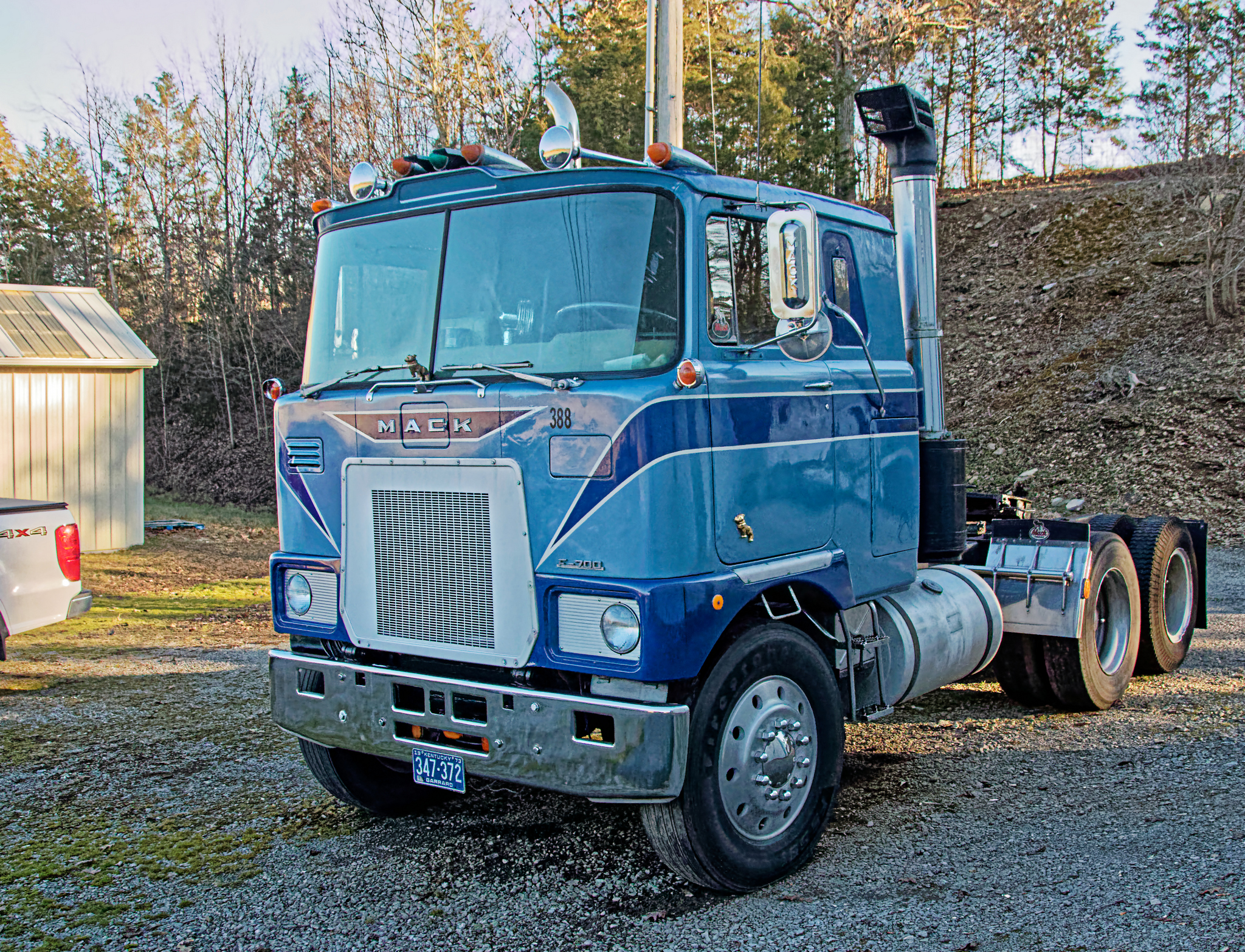
1976 Mack F-700 in Kentucky

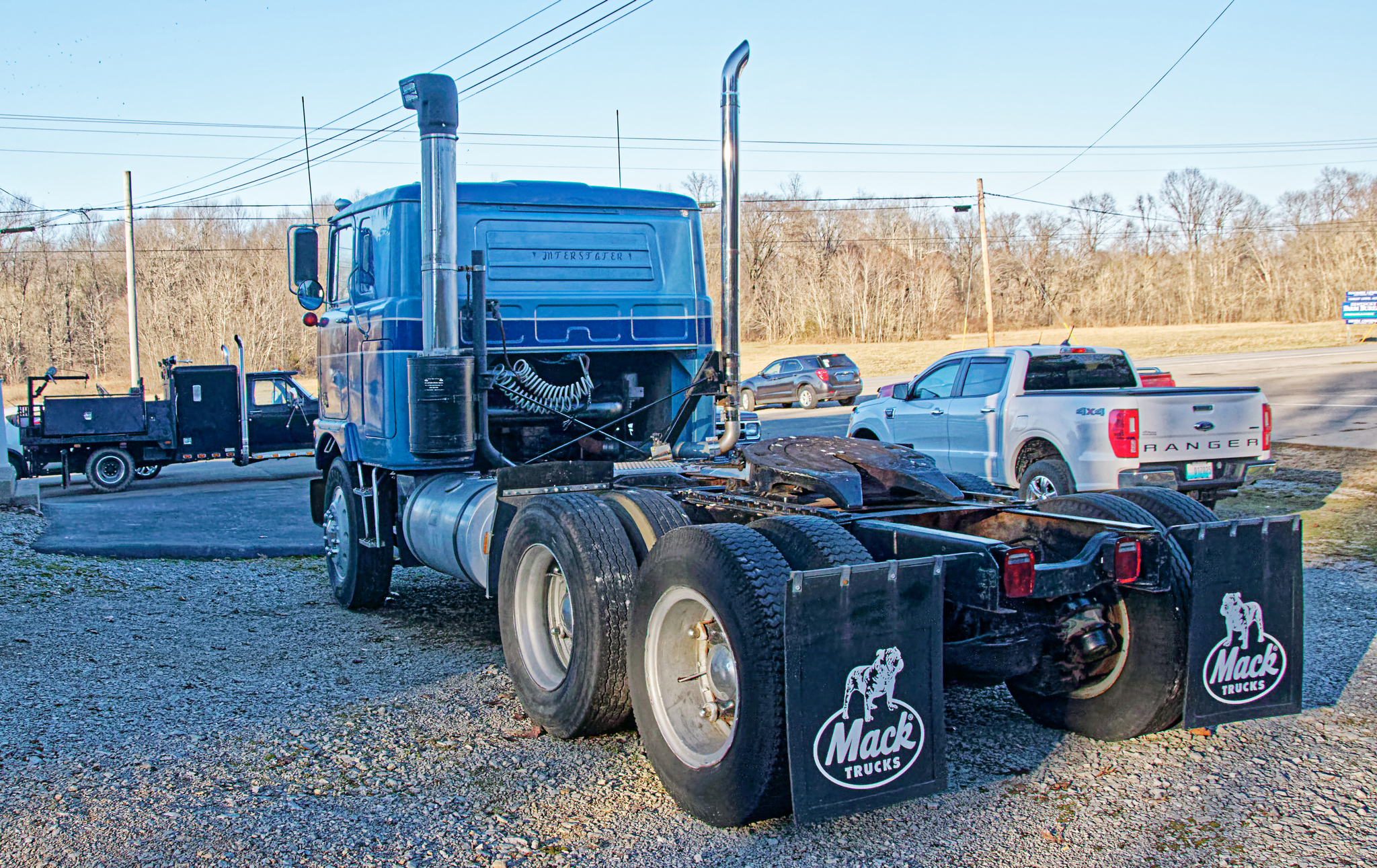
1976 Mack F-700 in Kentucky

The Mack F series was the third generation of cabover trucks from Mack Trucks. Its production began in 1962 and ended in 1981. It was produced primarily as a set-forward axle truck but a setback axle version was shipped overseas (from the USA). The cab came in a 50-inch (1371.6 mm) day cab (no sleeper). Sleeper models included a 72-inch (1828.8 mm), 80 inch (2032 mm) and later a "bustle back" was added that lengthened the sleeper to 86 inches (2184.4 mm).

== Model range ==
- F6xx
- F7xx
- F8xx
- F9xx

== Engines ==
The F Model offered 5 different diesel engines, Mack's Maxidyne and Thermodyne at 260-375 hp, Cummins - 250-350 hp, Detroit Diesel - 270-430 hp and Caterpillar - 325 hp.

- Caterpilar 3406 was a big-bore diesel available in both high-torque-rise and conventional torque-rise versions
- Detroit Diesel 71 series, provided power with a high torque curve.
- Cummins Formula 350 “Big Cam” engine is governed at 1900RPM and provides 1065 ft-lbs of torque at 1300RPM. The formula 290 is also governed at 1900RPM and provides 930 ft-lbs of torque. The NTC series of engines was also available.

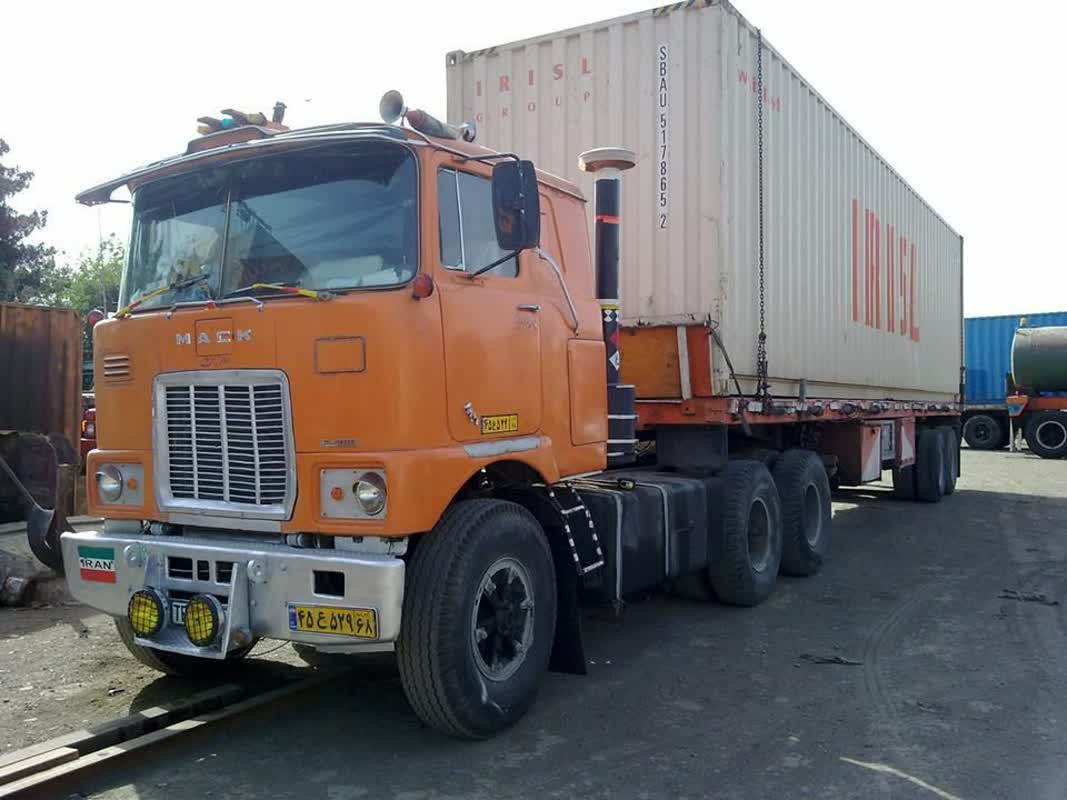
F700 in Iran

The table shows the Mack diesel engines available in the series.

Chassis Model	Engine	Displacement	No. Of Cyl.	Horsepower	Torque
F712T	ETAZ 673A	672 cu in (11.0 L)	6	315 hp (235 kW)@1900	1,050 lbf⋅ft (1,424 N⋅m)@1450
F747T	NTC 290	855 cu in (14.0 L)	6	290 hp (216 kW)@2100	930 lbf⋅ft (1,261 N⋅m)@1300
	NTC 290	855 cu in (14.0 L)	6	270 hp (201 kW)@2100	930 lbf⋅ft (1,261 N⋅m)@1300
	FORMAUL 290	855 cu in (14.0 L)	6	290 hp (216 kW)@1900	930 lbf⋅ft (1,261 N⋅m)@1300
	FORMAUL 290	855 cu in (14.0 L)	6	270 hp (201 kW)@1900	930 lbf⋅ft (1,261 N⋅m)@1300
F785T	MAXIDYNE 675	672 cu in (11.0 L)	6	237 hp (177 kW)@1700	906 lbf⋅ft (1,228 N⋅m)@1000
F786T	MAXIDYNE 676	675 cu in (11.1 L)	6	285 hp (213 kW)@1800	1,080 lbf⋅ft (1,464 N⋅m)@1000
F795T	MAXIDYNE 865	866 cu in (14.2 L)	8	322 hp (240 kW)@2100	1,100 lbf⋅ft (1,491 N⋅m)@1350
	MAXIDYNE 865C	866 cu in (14.2 L)	8	317 hp (236 kW)@2100	1,211 lbf⋅ft (1,642 N⋅m)@1350

== Chassis ==
The Mack F series truck uses taper-leaf front springs, which helps to provide a smoother ride. Taper-lead springs practically eliminate the inter-leaf friction, which is common with multi-leaf spring systems. The taper concept uses springs of equal length and different contour, to assure the springs do not slide against one another while in normal operation. This arrangement, accompanied by forged aluminum rear brackets and shackles equate to a comfortable ride.

- Front axles rated to 18,000 lb (8,200 kg). Constructed from drop-forged I-beam construction.
- Power steering is available.
- Rear axles rated to 23,000 lb (10,000 kg)
- Maximum GCWR 75,000 lb (34,000 kg)

Chassis equipment:

- 50 Gallon Fuel Tank
- Automatic reset circuit breakers
- Back-up Light
- Break-away safety valve
- Cab roof vent
- Combination heater and defroster, 42000 BTU
- Combination stop, tail, and rear turn signals(2)
- Engine water conditioner (cummins engine)
- Engine stop control
- Horn, electric, single tone
- I.D. & clearance lamps
- Low air pressure buzzer
- Two rear view mirror
- Undercoating
- Vertical exhaust

== See also ==
- Mack Trucks
- List of Mack Trucks Products
