= Daimler Motor Lastwagen =

Daimler Motor-Lastwagen
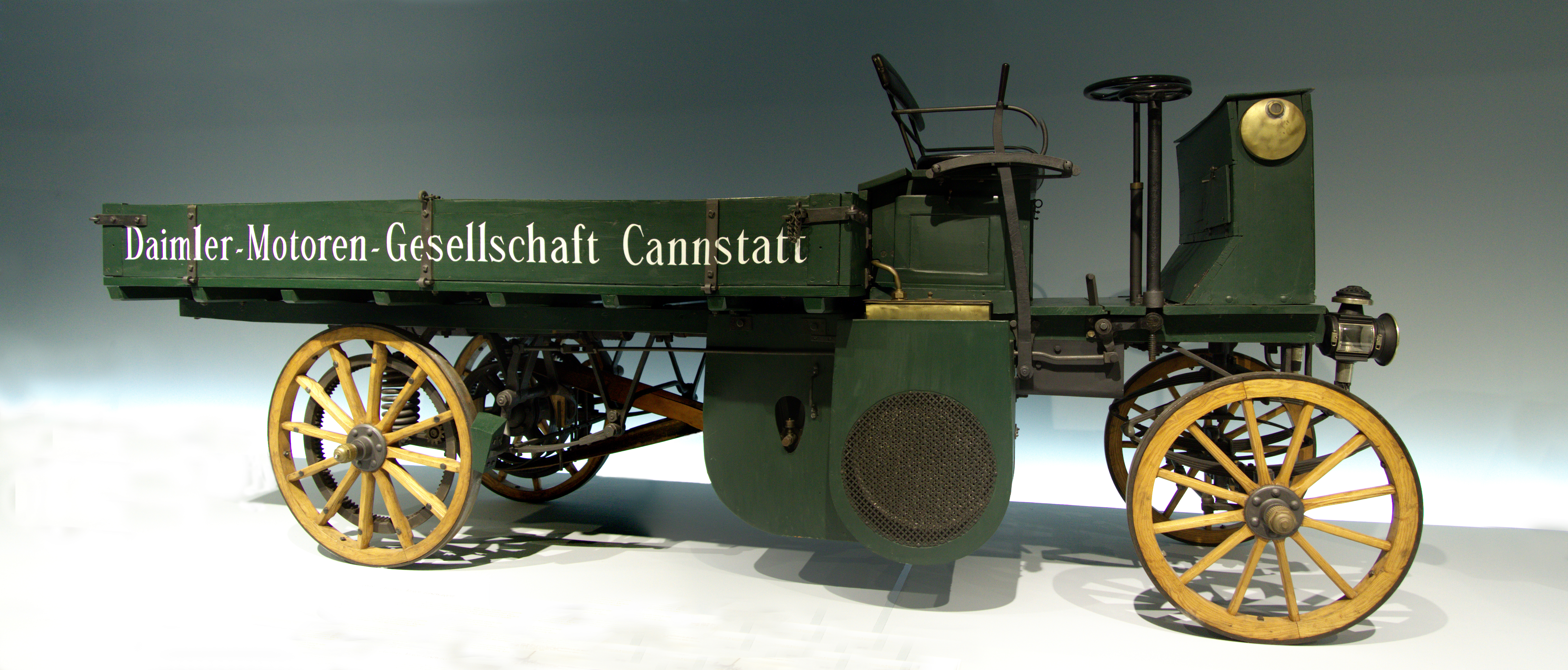
- Daimler truck at Mercedes-Benz Museum

Overview
- Manufacturer: Daimler Motoren Gesellschaft
- Production: 1896
- Designer: Gottlieb Daimler

Body and chassis
- Class: Truck

Powertrain
- Engine: 1.4-litre four-stroke Phoenix

The Daimler Motor-Lastwagen is the world's first truck, manufactured in the year 1896 by Daimler Motoren Gesellschaft and designed by Gottlieb Daimler.

== History ==
In 1896, Gottlieb Daimler and Wilhelm Maybach began developing a truck with a 1.06-liter two-cylinder four-stroke engine built into the rear, which developed 4 hp (2.9 kW ). The one with hot-tube ignition and injection nozzle carburetor equipped engine was the first prototype built yet behind the rear axle and driving the rear wheels through a four-speed belt drive. The car had turntable steering and a manually operated block brake that acted on the iron tires on the rear wheels. There was also a foot-operated shoe brake on the countershaft. The vehicle was 4.5 m long and 1.5 m wide, the payload was given as 1500 kg, and the top speed was 12 kmph. Its purchase price was 5,200 marks.

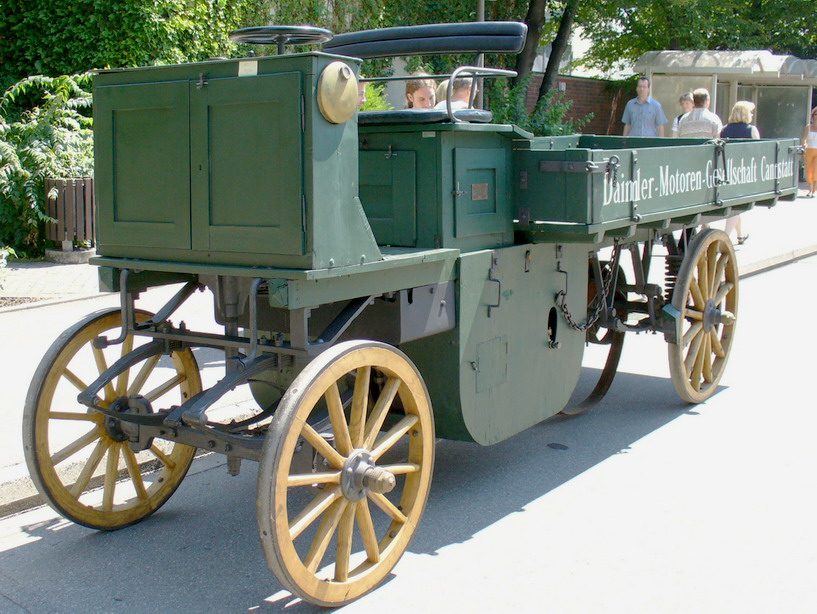

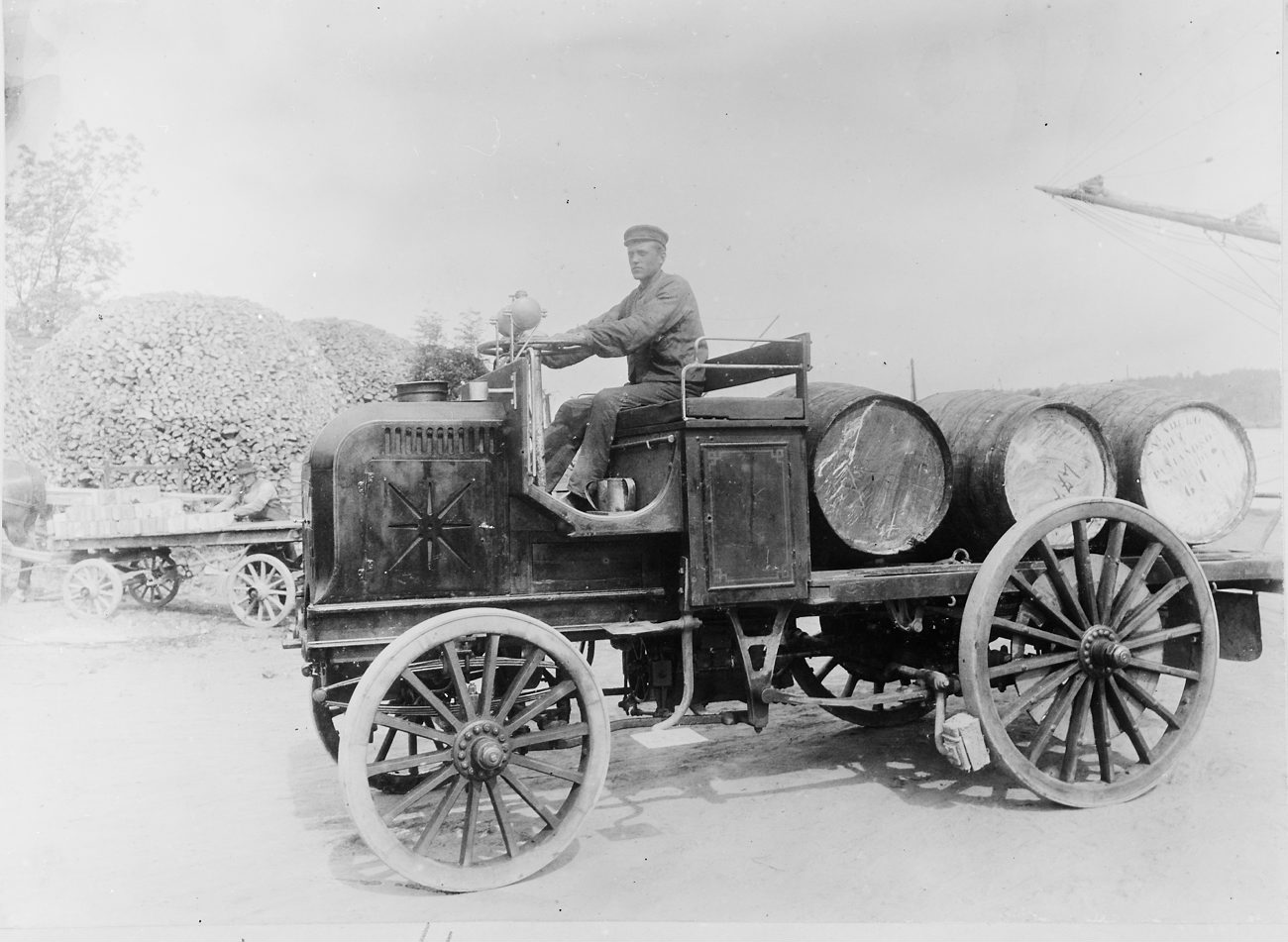
Daimler Motor Wagon, 6 HP, 1898

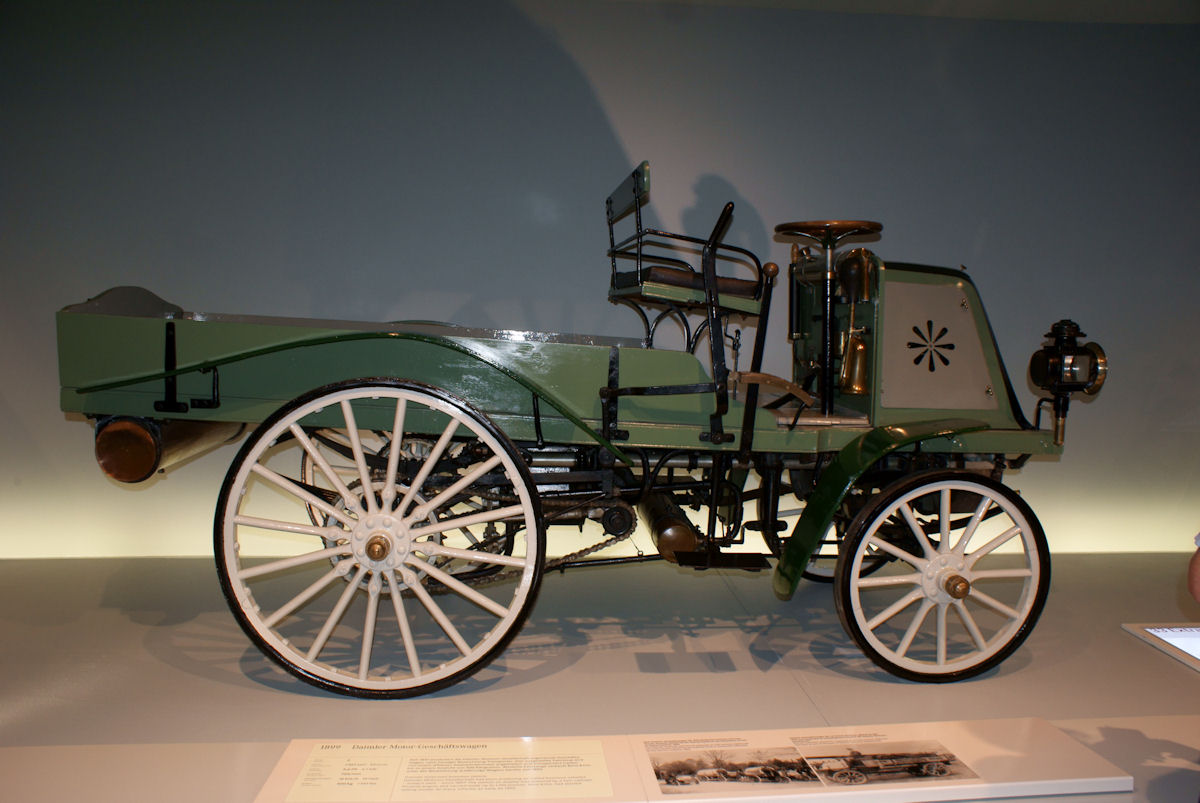
Daimler Motor-Geschäftswagen, 1899 (Daimler Phoenix)

On 1 October 1896, Daimler sold the first truck ("Order No. 81") to the British Motor Syndicate in London. In this model, the motor had been enlarged to 1.53 liters with 6 HP (4.4 kW), was installed under the driver's seat. In the same year, Daimler-Motoren-Gesellschaft was the first vehicle manufacturer in the world to launch a model range of various trucks that were available in four different power levels: 2.9 kW, 4.4 kW, 5.9 kW and 7.4 kW. The payloads ranged from 1.2 tons to 5 tons.

According to documents from Daimler were delivered by January 1899 "ten load and thirteen Bierwagen". Customers included the Paul von Maur freight forwarder in Stuttgart and the Bohemian brewery in Berlin, which used the Daimler motor truck as a "beer wear truck".
