= Cab-over =

Vehicle with cabin above the engine

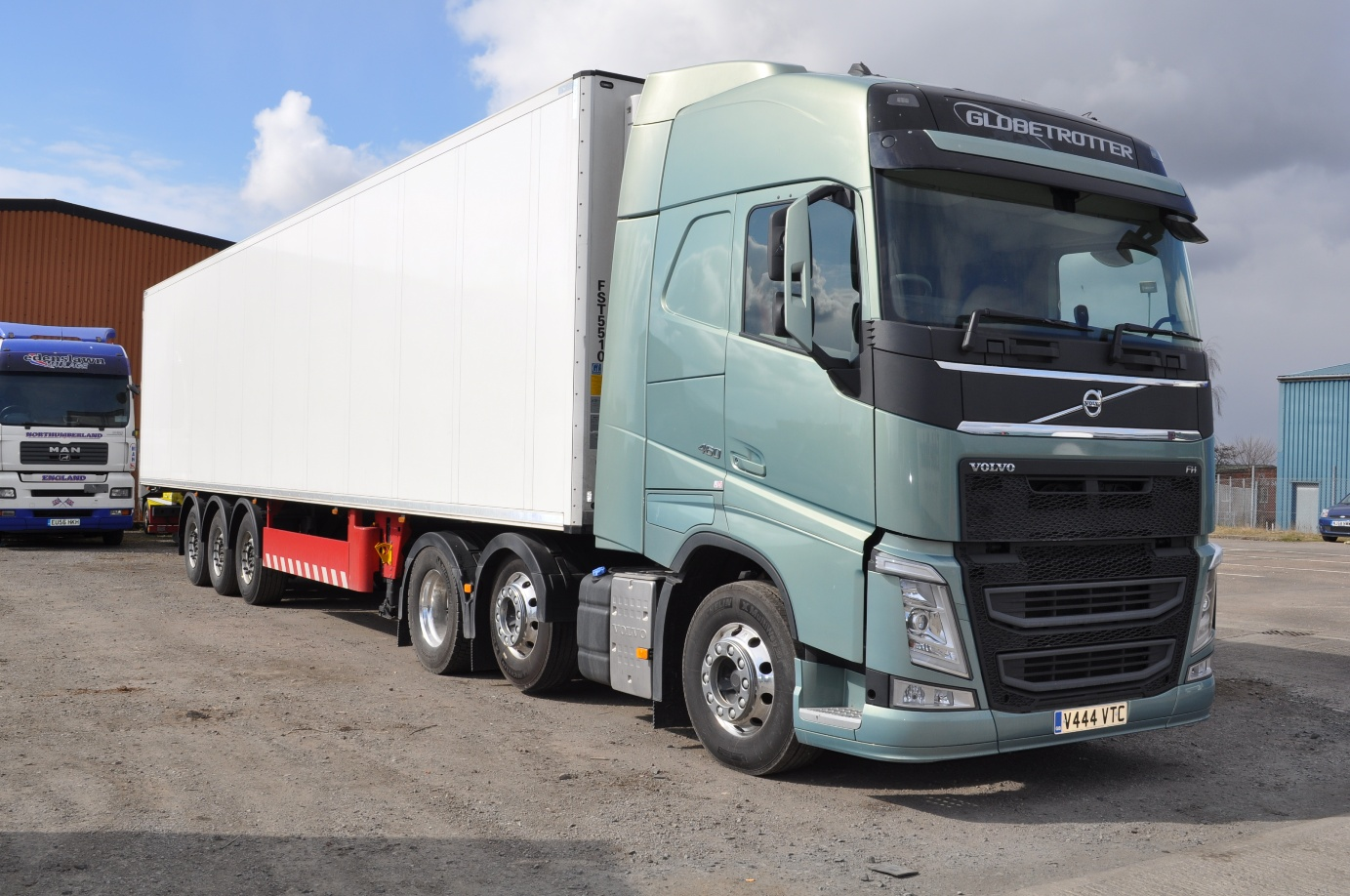
- Volvo FH cab-over

Overview
- Manufacturer: Various
- Also called: COE, forward control
- Production: 1899–present
- Assembly: Worldwide

Body and chassis
- Class: Light, medium, and heavy
- Body style: Cab over engine

Cab-over, also known as cab over engine (COE), cab forward or flat face (U.S.), flat nose (Canada), or forward control (UK), is a body style of truck, bus, or van that has a vertical front, "flat face" or a semi-hood, with the cab of the truck sitting above (or forward of) the front axle. This contrasts with a conventional truck where the engine is mounted in front of the driver.

This truck configuration is currently common among European and Asian truck manufacturers. European regulations set restrictions for both the total length and the length of the load area, which allow a cab length of 2.35 m (7 ft 8 1/2 in) in combination with the maximum load area length. This allows a sleeper cab with a narrow bunk, or a bonneted (hooded) day cab. Nonetheless, no manufacturer in Europe produces such day cabs with bonnets. The last manufacturer of a conventional truck in Europe, Scania, stopped production in 2005 due to a decline in sales to less than 1000 units worldwide, with European sales declining by 50% and sales in South America by 90%, within one decade. In addition, Asian regulations are typically stricter, and the relatively shorter journey distances allow trucks to forgo sleepers to save even more length.

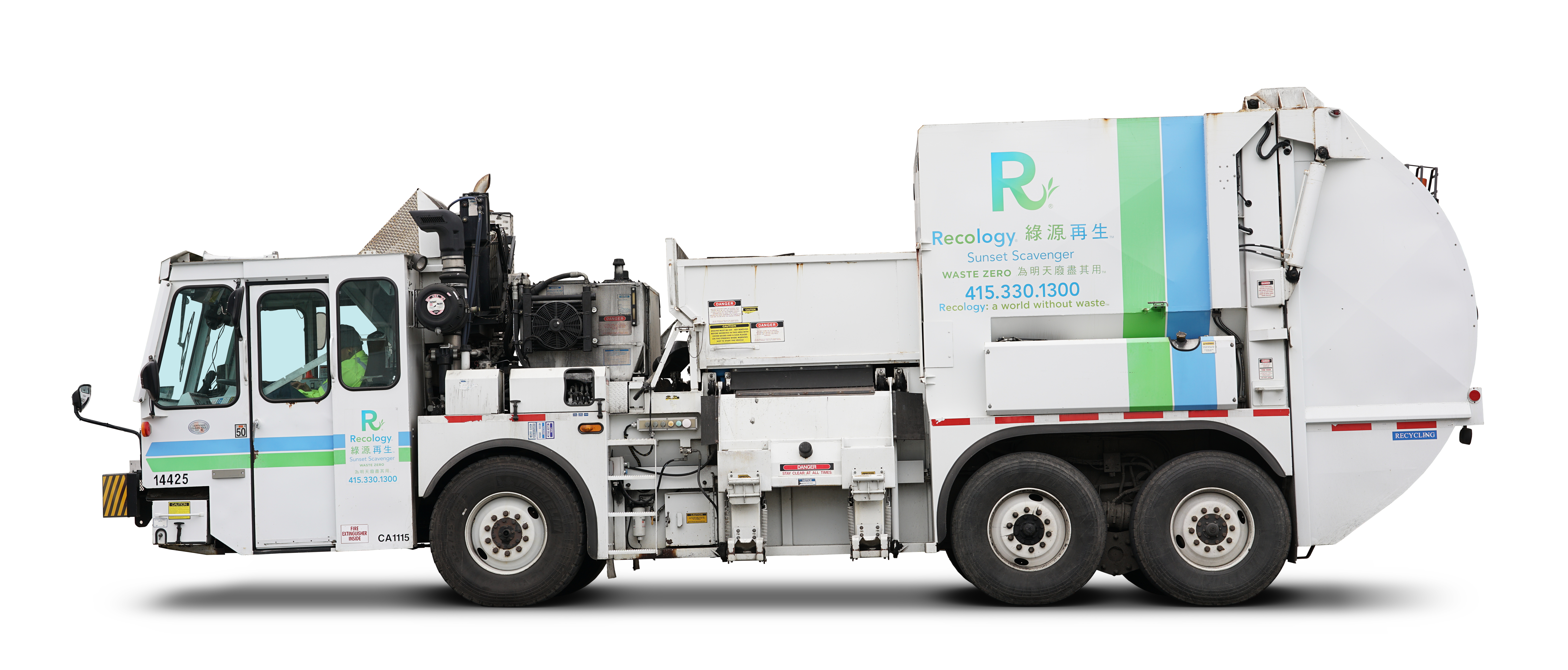
The cab-over configuration is common for garbage trucks, as the short wheelbase allows a tight turning radius and the low cab height eases driver entry and exit.

Cab-over trucks are widely used in the United States for refuse collection, terminal tractors, and other vocational applications requiring a tight turning radius or frequent ingress/egress by the driver. Autocar, the oldest surviving motor vehicle manufacturer in America, produces primarily cabover trucks. Although cabover trucks were popular among U.S. heavy truckers and trucking companies during the 1970s because of strict length laws in many states, when those length laws were repealed, most heavy-truck makers moved to other body styles. One of the reasons is the Federal Bridge Formula, which is unique to the US, and encourages spreading out the load. If axle distances are too tight, the maximum load allowance is reduced. For COEs operated at maximum weight in the US, this required an axle directly behind the front bumper. This cab design caused an awkward climb into the cab for the driver, forcing them to climb up behind the front wheel, then move to the front and into the cab. European or Chinese or Japanese truckers enter their cab in a straight fashion with handrails left and right.

Cabovers are also very popular in the US's light- and medium-duty truck segment where compact size is required for urban mobility without sacrificing payload; Hino (an Archion subsidiary), Isuzu, and Mitsubishi Fuso models are a regular sight for this reason. American company Paccar (which owns the Kenworth and Peterbilt brands) manufactures traditional cab over engine designs for the Australian and South African markets where length restrictions still make them advantageous.

In Australia, Mexico, Russia, or New Zealand both American (cab over axle) and European/Chinese (cab forward of axle) types, as well as the conventional type are common. Cab over engine types dominate urban and light duty use, with conventional trucks predominating in remote and off-road areas. Both types are common for highway use.

== History ==
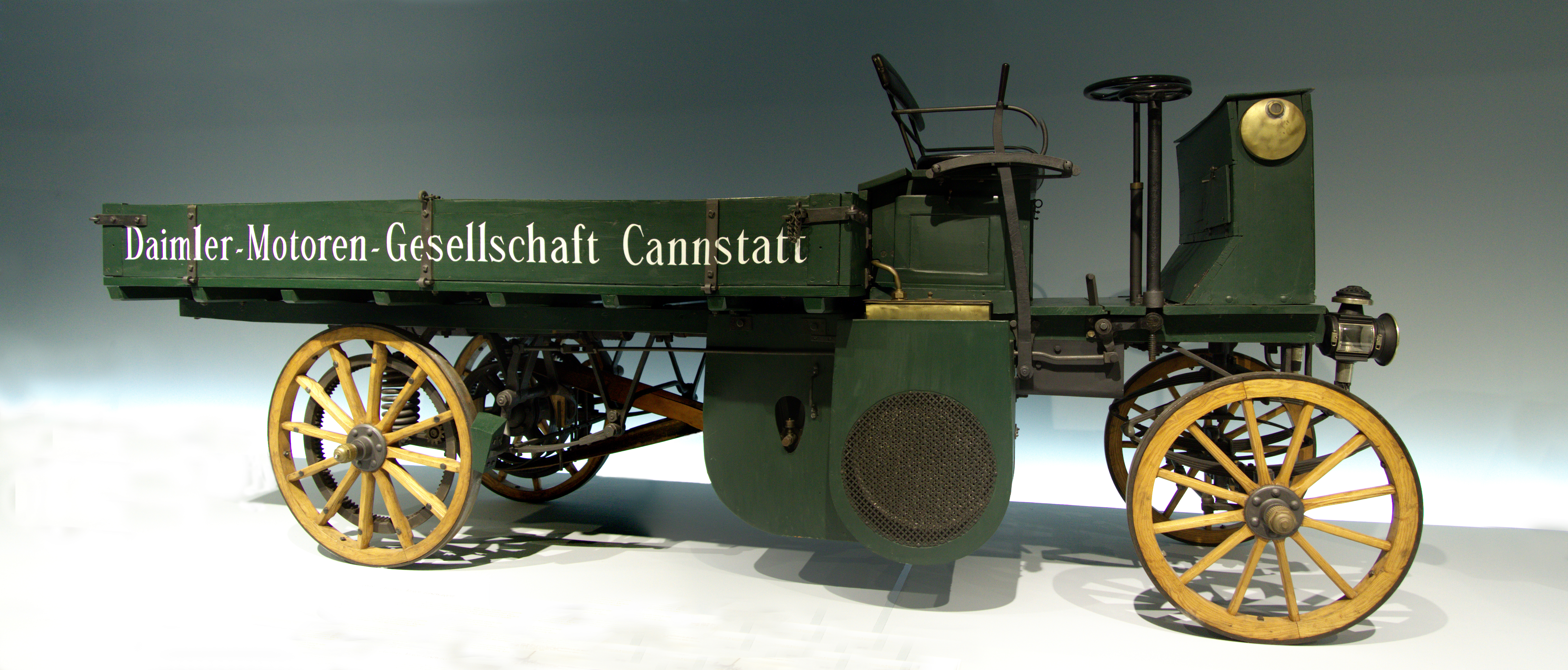
Daimler Motor Lastwagen "Order No. 81", originally delivered to London in 1896, considered the world's oldest truck. Now in the Mercedes-Benz Museum

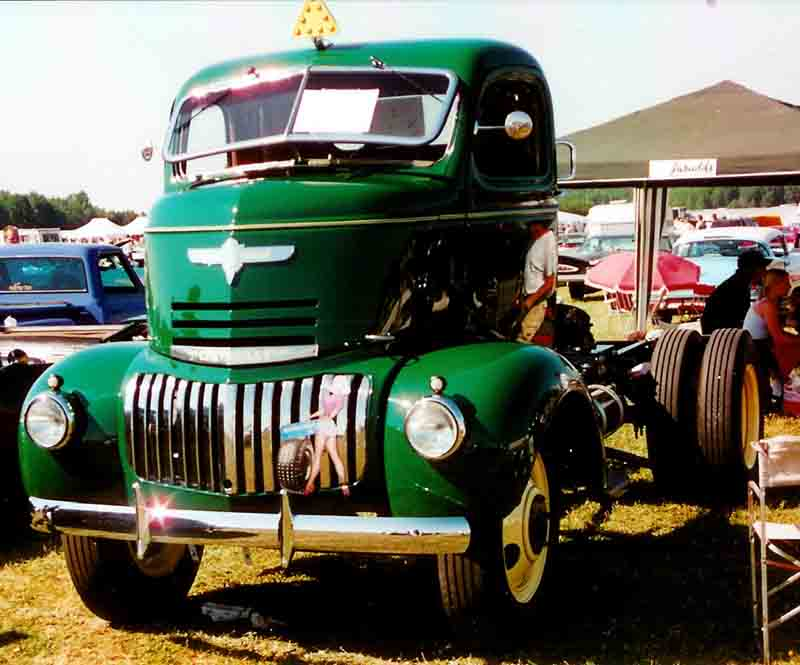
Vintage COE: 1942 Chevrolet

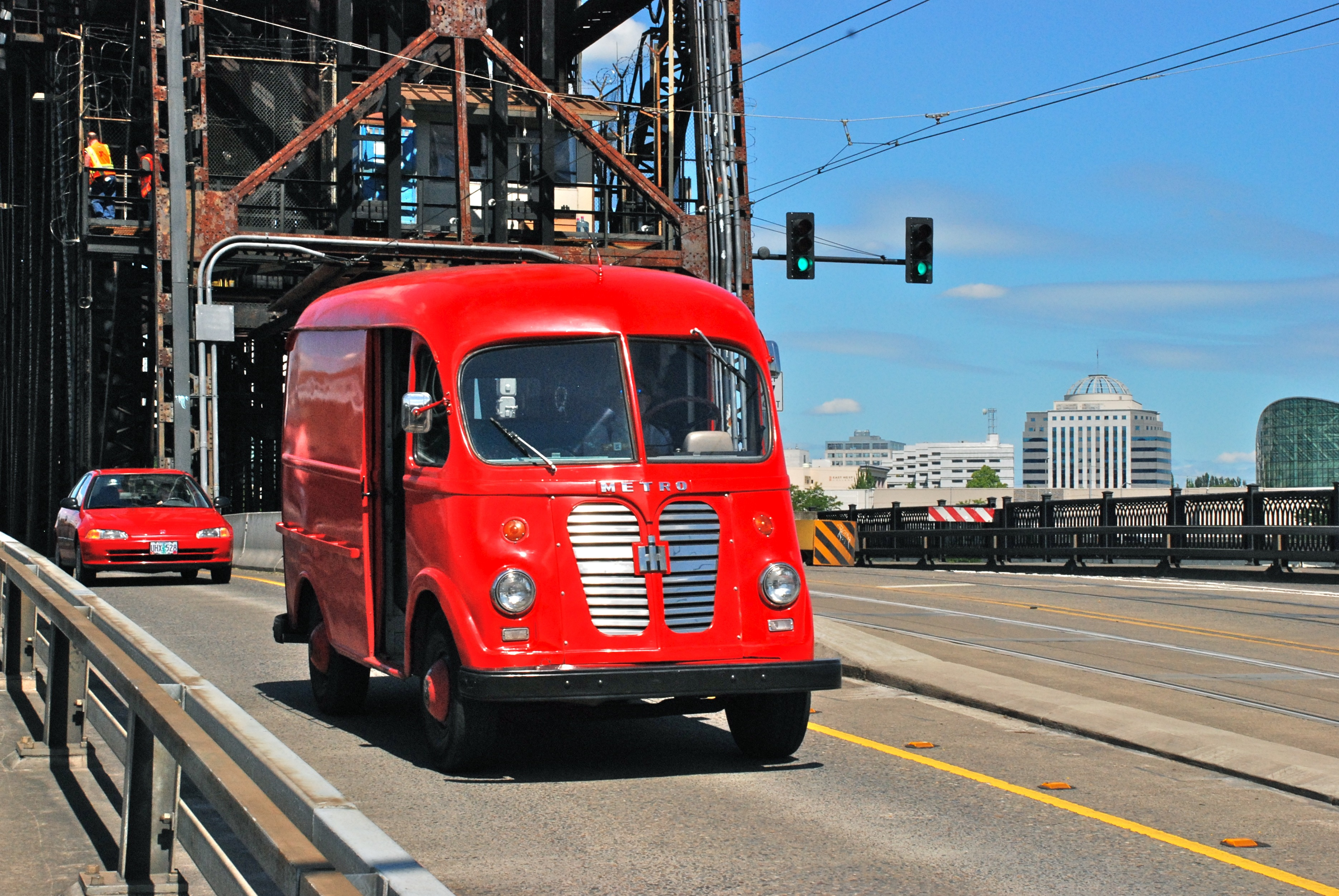
Preserved International Harvester Metro Van in Portland, Oregon in 2012

Similar to horse carriages, early horseless trucks had the driver in the front, and a flatbed behind, while Steam tractors and Traction engines of the 19th century were built like steam locomotives, with driver and stoker or fireman in the rear, shovelling coal. The German Daimler Motoren Gesellschaft of the 1890s not only sold complete cars and trucks, handmade in very low numbers, but also gasoline engines and licences to produce these engines under the name Daimler in several countries, including Austria (Austro-Daimler), France Panhard & Levassor, Peugeot), Britain (Daimler Company and the US (Daimler Manufacturing Company, American Mercedes). Thus the technology quickly spread around the world. A range of Daimler Motor Lastwagen was developed in 1894. "Order No. 81", originally delivered to London in 1896, is considered the world's oldest truck. It basically has a cabin over the engine design, but still roofless, doorless, and without windscreen due to low maximum speed.

The first truck in the United States was built by Autocar in 1899 using a format then called "engine-under-the-seat" and was available with optional 5 or 8 horsepower (3.7 or 6.0 kilowatts) motors. Although early Autocar trucks were not exactly "cab-over", since the truck did not have a cab, per se, they were the fore-runners to COEs. The Sternberg company of Wisconsin produced cab-over trucks as early as 1907, though by 1914 only their seven-ton model was a cab-over. They reintroduced the cab-over layout in 1933 with their "Camel Back" model, which allowed the cab to be tilted to access the engine.

The introduction of the first modern cab-over layout in the United States is credited to industrial designer Viktor Schreckengost, who, with engineer Ray Spiller, designed a cab-over truck for the White Motor Company in 1932. Schreckengost was later joined by other designers such as Raymond Loewy who designed the Metro series of vans and trucks for International Harvester. The bodies for these vehicles were initially produced by the Metropolitan Body Company (MBC). The company produced a wide variety of truck and commercial bodies for several vehicle manufacturers such as Chevrolet, Ford, Dodge Bros., and International Harvester until 1948 when they were purchased by the latter. MBC was instrumental in the development of COE route delivery bodies in the 1930s.

The laws of the time limited overall truck length to 42 feet (12.8 m) on highways. Setting the cab over the engine and front axle shaved several feet off the length of the tractor, feet which could then be added to the length of the trailer while keeping the dimensions of the entire truck within the permissible limit. Schreckengost patented the design in 1934.

Autocar reintroduced the engine-under-the-seat format with their Model U in 1933, which became a staple of U.S. roads and the U.S. military through World War II and well into the 1950s.

White-Freightliner introduced its first tilting cab-over design in 1958, which allowed the entire cab to tilt forward for access to the engine.

== Design aspects ==
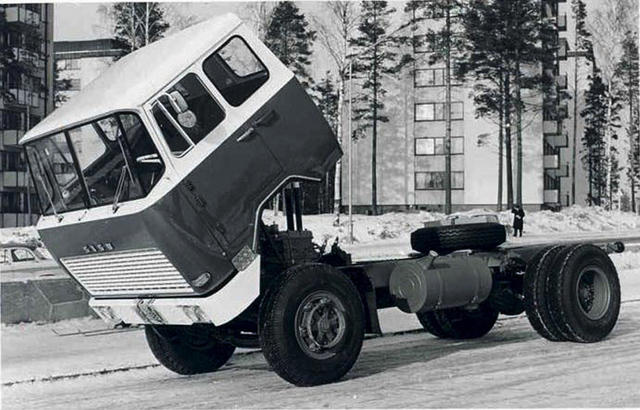
The 1962 Sisu KB-112/117 was the first European serial produced truck with a hydraulically tiltable cabin, enabling easy access to the engine.

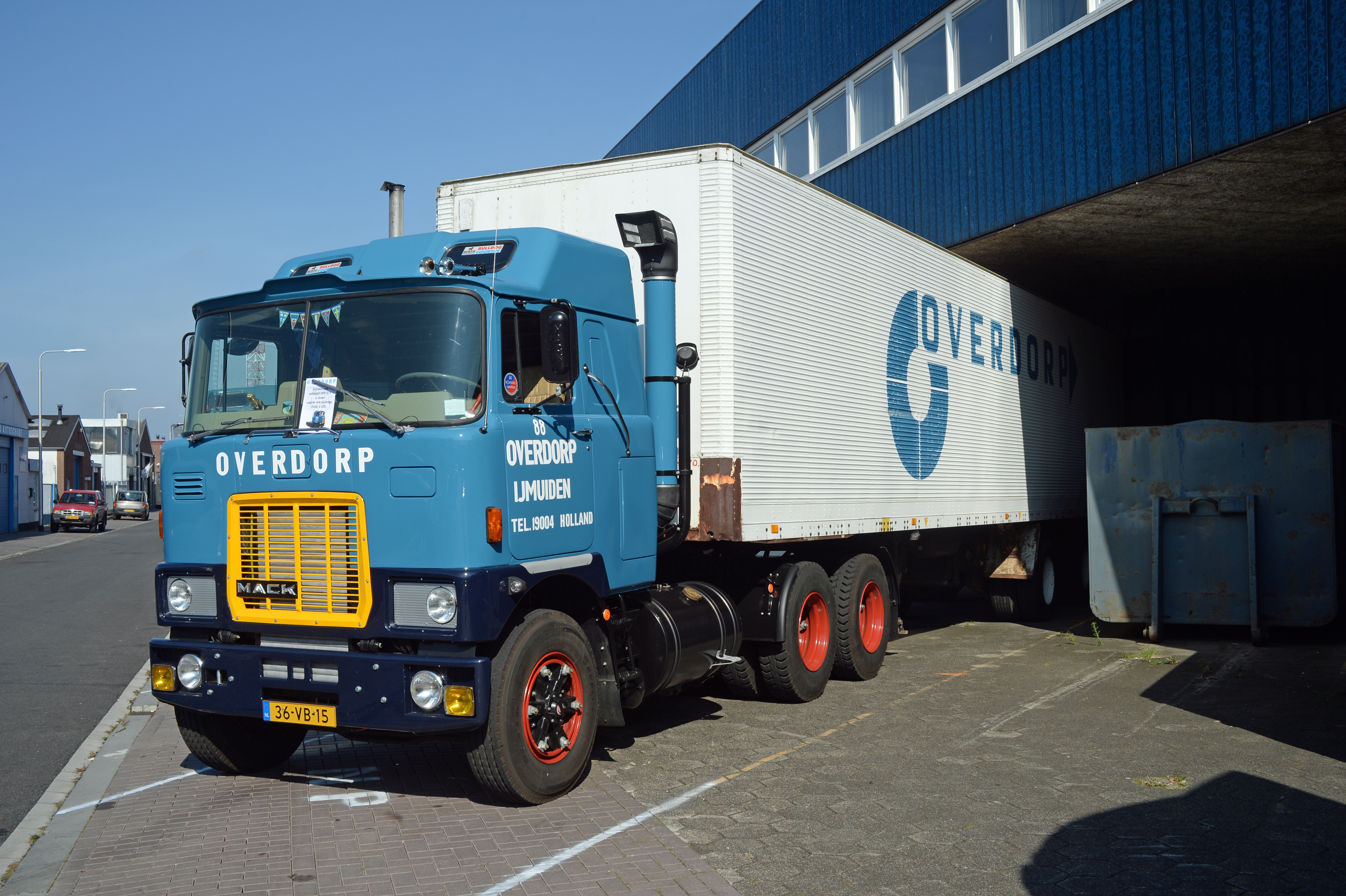
A Mack F series truck

In Class 8 tractors (using the US designation), the cab-over design allows the vehicle's wheelbase to be shorter than in the conventional arrangement, wherein the engine is placed in front of the cab, covered by a horizontal or sloping hood that opens to allow engine access. Its shorter wheelbase allows cab-over semi-trucks to have a shorter overall length, thereby allowing for longer trailers to be used. For light- and medium-duty solid- or rigid-axle trucks, the cab-over design requires less length for the cab and engine, in a given wheelbase, and therefore allows a greater length for the truck body or load area.

In both class 8 tractors and light- and medium-duty vocational trucks, the cab-over-engine design gives the COE model an advantage in maneuverability over a conventional model. And since COEs are generally lighter than conventionals, they can often haul heavier loads, given equal gross vehicle weight rating (GVWRs) and gross combination weight rating (GCWRs). Despite the COE designs' being smaller in general, over-the-road tractors can still be fully equipped with single or bunk beds. Also, lack of a hood gives better visibility to the driver and a tighter turning radius, and significantly reduces the forward blind spots.

One critique is that the shorter wheelbase in the COE semi-trucks gives a rougher ride than those with conventional cabs, as the driver's seat is above the front axle. In the 1970s, COEs used to be noisier, because the engine is directly below. This was an important consideration back then: Interior noise in the cab was between 80 and 90 dB(A), creating an unhealthy work environment.

Because of their flat front design, early COE semi-trucks had significantly worse aerodynamics than conventional tractors. Modern cab-over designs, in both semi-trucks and light- and medium-duty models, have improved aerodynamics significantly over early models, but often still have higher drag coefficients than their modern conventional-design counterparts.

Although the tilting cab gives comparatively unobstructed access to the engine, its deployment causes unsecured items in the cab and sleeper (if equipped) to fall onto the windshield or under the instrument panel. Vehicles without a tilting cab will usually be equipped with removable floor panels through which mechanics can access and service the engine. In Europe, Mercedes-Benz was the last manufacturer to use such panels instead of a tilting cab, with the last non-tilting cabs produced well into 1983.

=== Safety aspects ===
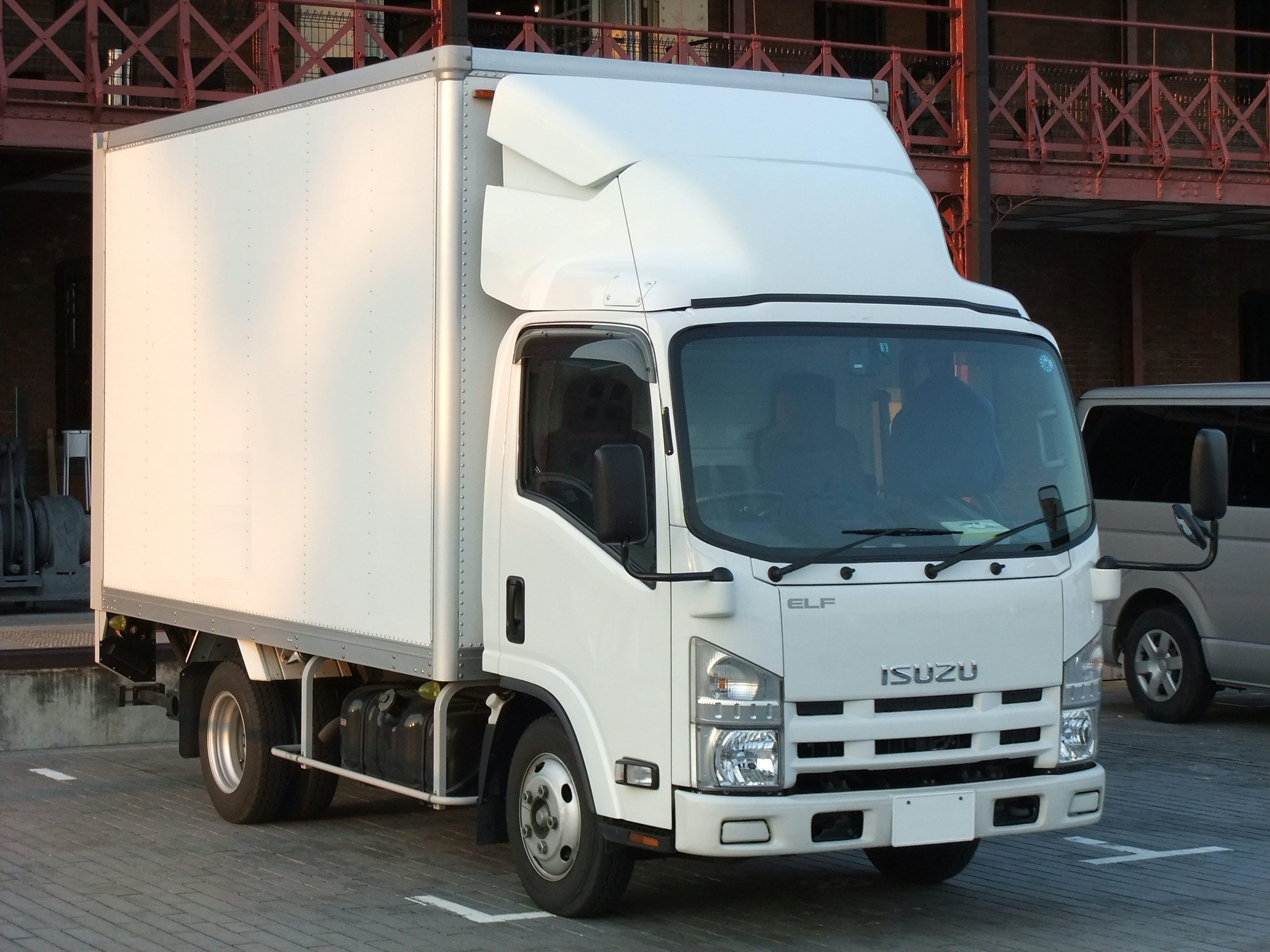
Isuzu Elf box truck

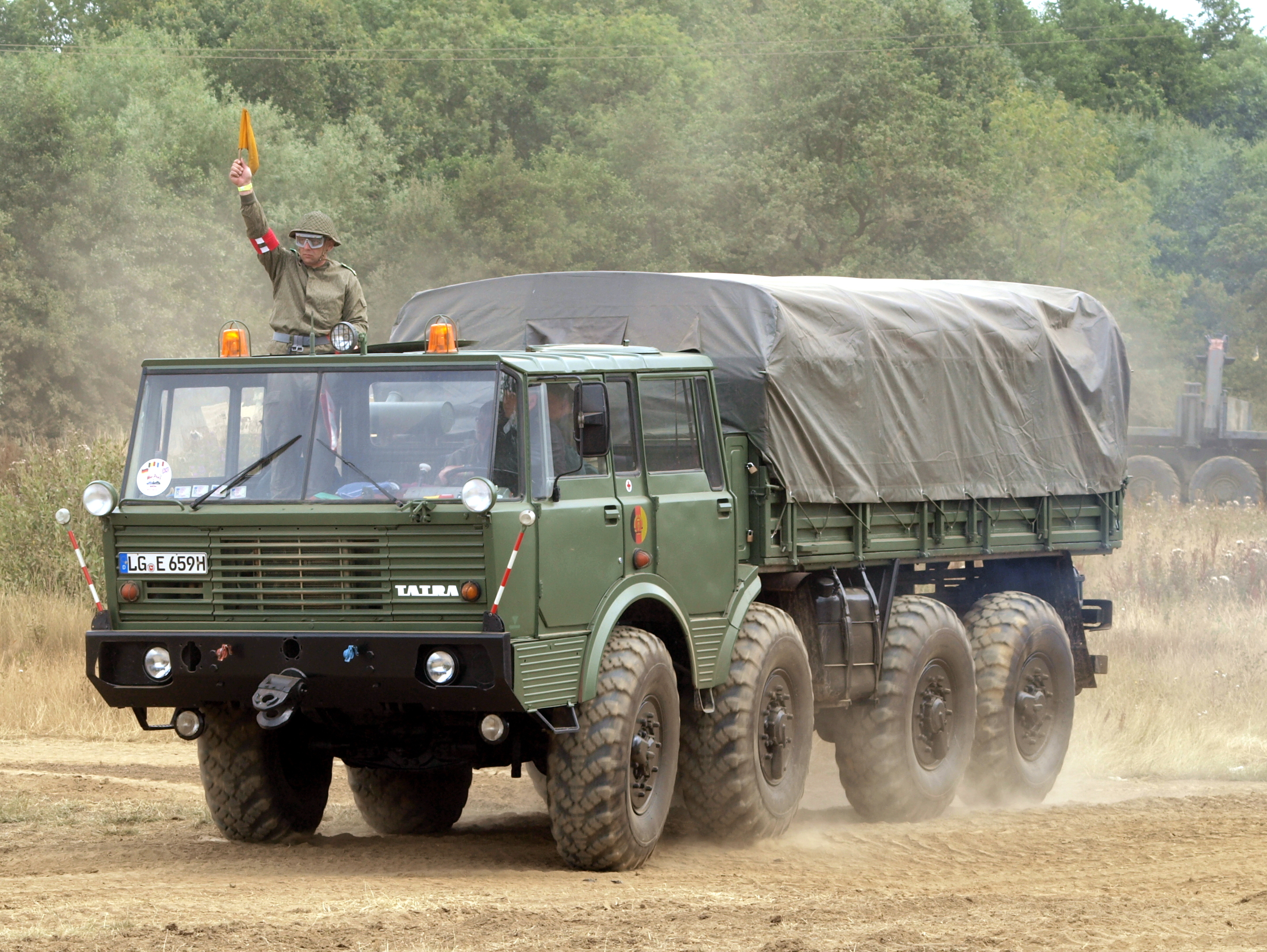
Tatra 813 Kolos 8x8 Drive Military Truck

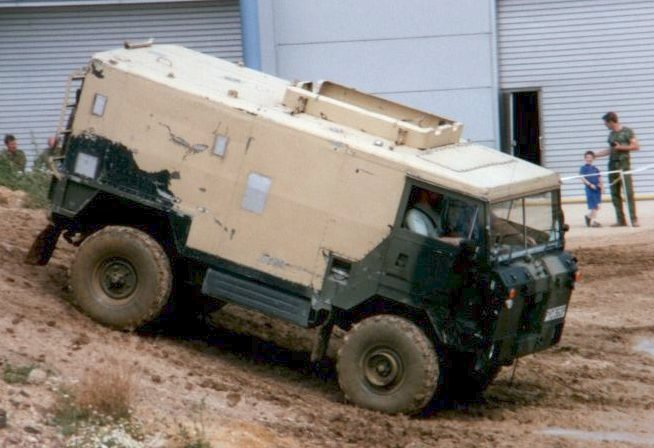
Land Rover 101 Forward Control with radio-vehicle body

Truck occupant safety depends on survival space within the cab, with "rollover" being the most significant heavy truck accident causing occupant casualties. In the 1950s, when many truck cabs were still wooden structures, knowledge about the most common accidents was already established, and led to the first mechanized truck cab crash test in 1959, performed by Volvo. The test became a Swedish standard, and was adopted by the European Community in simplified form as ECE R-29 in 1974. During the early 1980s, the safest place for a truck driver was a European truck, usually a cabover.

Motor placement before or under the cab does not have much influence on the results of rollovers. Behind the danger of a rollover, heavy truck on heavy truck crashes are the second most relevant reason for occupant casualties. With a 1980s US conventional, the result of such a crash was: Frame, front axle and wheels would go under the truck in front, while the motor got pushed into the cab (which was very small in a 1980s conventional).

Both conventionals and cabovers need structural protection against rollovers, and special protection against massive objects at the height of another truck body. The survival space should be able to move backward on the frame.

In military use, the COE design increases the chance of crew injury or death in the event of running over a landmine. This is because the tire that detonates the mine is directly below/beside the driver.

== See also ==
- Kei truck
- List of low cab forward trucks
- Terminal tractor
- Tractor unit
