= Saviem JL =

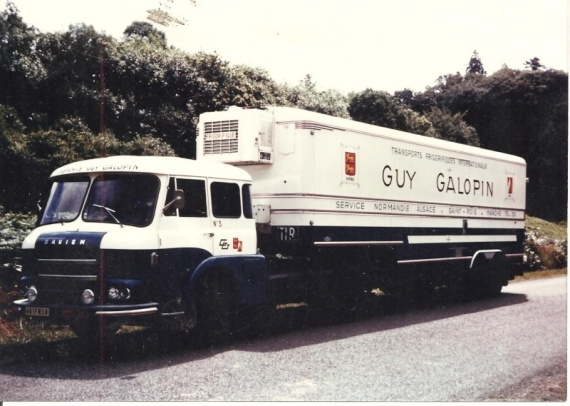

Overview
- Manufacturer: Saviem
- Production: 1957–1963
- Assembly: Blainville-sur-Orne, France

Body and chassis
- Class: Heavy/medium truck

Powertrain
- Engine: 4.8 L Fulgur I4; 6.8 L Fulgur I6; 9.3 L Panhard D615H I6; 11.0 L Henschel 520 D6 I6
- Transmission: Manual

Chronology
- Predecessor: Somua JL/Saviem-LRS JL
- Successor: Saviem JM/Saviem S

The Saviem JL was a range of heavy/medium trucks manufactured by the French manufacturer Saviem, a subsidiary of Renault.

== Characteristics ==
The Saviem JL range was based on the JL range from Somua. The JL was initially powered by engines from Alfa Romeo, Panhard, and other suppliers. In 1961, it adopted a revised front with double head lamps and was fitted with the Fulgur diesel engines assembled at the Limoges factory, which would become part of Saviem.

In 1963, as part of Saviem's agreements, some JL models incorporated MAN engines, changing its denomination and forming the new JM range. The ones which preserved the Fulgur engines were renamed as S (S9). The JL denomination was still sporadically used afterwards.

== Engines ==
When built by Somua, the JL was offered with a variety of engines, including Renaults, Henschels and Alfa Romeos. In 1961, Saviem began standardizing the use of two Fulgur diesel units of 4.8 and 6.8 litres with a power outputs of 100 and 150 hp (74 and 110 kW) respectively, although the heaviest JL20/200 kept using an 11-litre Henschel direct injection diesel producing 204 hp (150 kW) and the JL20 retained the 9.35-litre Panhard D615H (licensed by Lanova) diesel. The JL was replaced by the Saviem JM in 1964, with a more modern design and more powerful engines.
