= RMMV HX range of tactical trucks =

Tactical military truck

Rheinmetall MAN Military Vehicles (RMMV) HX range of tactical trucks
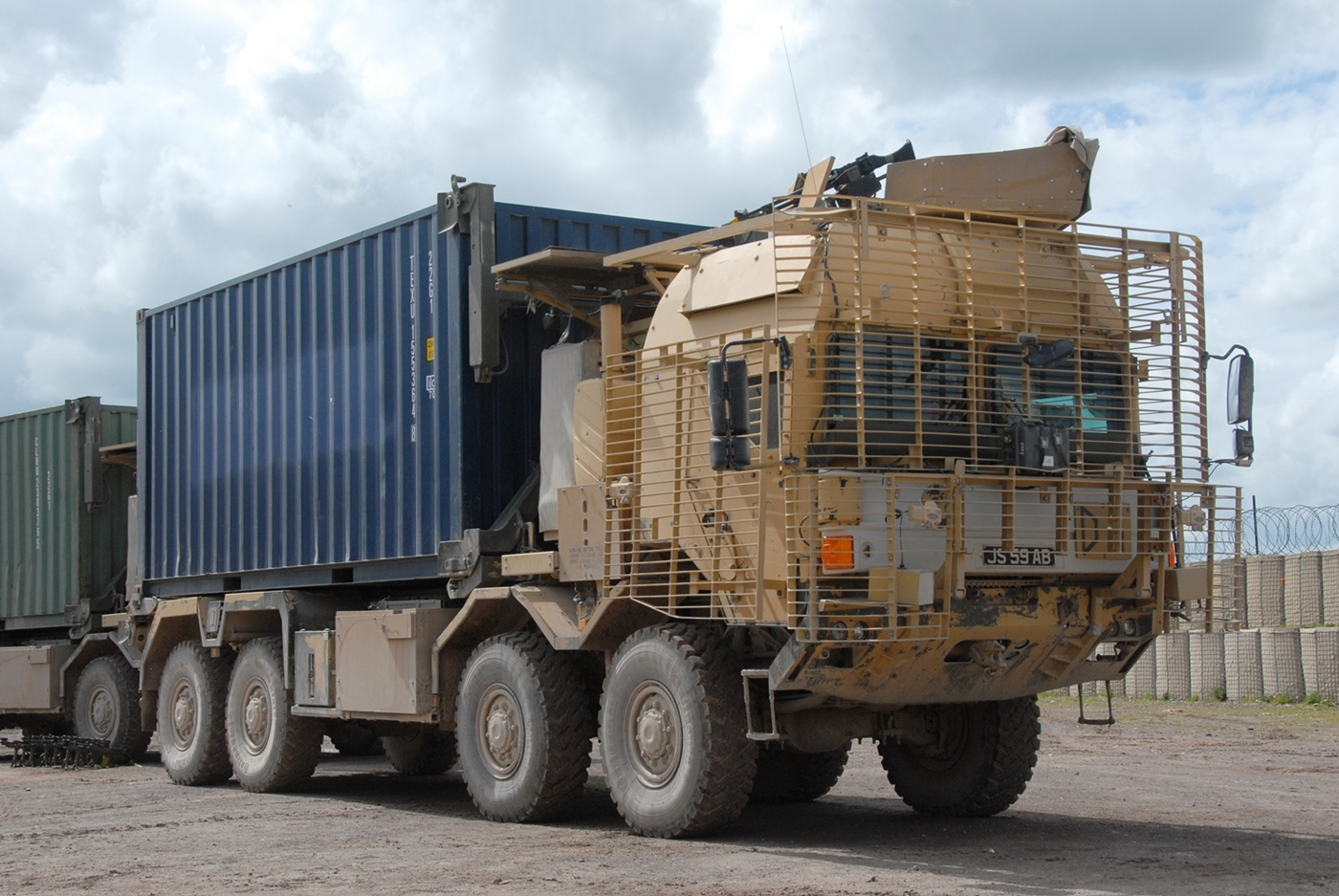
- A British Army HX77 (8×8) EPLS with Project Fortress protection upgrade. Under a contract awarded in 2018 382 HX77 were retrofitted to EPLS configuration
- Type: Tactical military truck
- Place of origin: Austria (see History)

Service history
- In service: 2007–present
- Used by: See Operators

Production history
- Designer: RMMV
- Designed: 2002
- Manufacturer: Rheinmetall MAN Military Vehicles (RMMV)
- Produced: 2005–present
- No. built: 19,535 est. Confirmed orders, not including options/remaining available call-offs on framework contracts, or any figure for Austrian framework contract. Est. 350 for Norway/Sweden as numbers currently unclear, and 270 estimate for Colombia, Egypt, Saudi Arabia, Thailand, Turkey, U.S., UAE, Ukraine (not including cascaded used/surplus) and Vietnam as no accurate data available)
- Variants: HX60 4×4, HX58 6×6, HX61 6×6, HX77 8×8, HX81 HET 8×8, 40M 4×4 (HX2), 42M 6×6 (HX2), 44M 8×8 (HX2), 45M 10×10 (HX2)

Specifications (HX77 8×8)
- Mass: 13,500 kg (chassis cab); 32,000 kg (laden); 44,000 kg (GCWR)
- Length: 10.336 m (chassis cab)
- Width: 2.5 m
- Height: 3.3 m (cab, unladen)
- Crew: Driver + 2 (protected cab options; see main text)
- Engine: MAN D2066, 10.518-litre, 6-cylinder inline water-cooled EURO 4 compliant diesel developing 440 hp @ 1900 rpm and 2100 Nm torque @ 1000 rpm
- Payload capacity: 17,000 kg (on chassis cab; approximate 15,000 kg cargo payload)
- Transmission: ZF 12 AS 23010D AS-Tronic (automated) with 12 forward and 2 reverse gears; MAN G172 two-speed transfer case with engageable front axle(s) drive
- Suspension: Parabolic leaf springs with progressively acting rubber assistors and hydraulic telescopic shock absorbers (front); inverted multi-leaf trapezoidal springs with radius rods (rear); anti-roll bar on second rear axle, rear
- Fuel capacity: 400 litres
- Operational range: 800 km (laden)
- Maximum speed: 100 km/h (technical maximum, unlimited)
- Steering system: power-assisted on front tandem

The HX family are a range of purpose-designed tactical military trucks manufactured by Rheinmetall MAN Military Vehicles (RMMV). The HX range was announced in 2003, and the first order was placed in 2004. The HX range replaced the earlier FX and LX ranges in production.

The HX2 range, which as of 2024 complements the original HX range, was announced in 2012. The first HX2 range trucks were delivered in April 2016. The HX and HX2 ranges originally complemented the SX range. In 2019, they replaced the SX range as the type was no longer produced.

The HX3 range was announced in May 2021, with series production scheduled from 2027.

== History ==
Rheinmetall MAN Military Vehicles, then MAN, confirmed it was developing the HX range at Defence Vehicles Dynamics (DVD) 2003. A developmental example was shown later at DSEi 2003. In 2004, the earlier LX range was superseded by the HX range. In 2005, the FX range was superseded.

In October 2004, the first order for the HX range came from the British Army, which announced that it had selected the then MAN ERF UK Ltd proposal to meet the Support Vehicle requirement. The contract was awarded in March 2005.

At Eurosatory 2012, an example of the HX2 range was displayed publicly for the first time by RMMV.

In May 2021, Rheinmetall unveiled the HX3. Introduction of HX3 models was held back by RMMV so that the significant TG model year 2025 (MY25) updates (predominantly electronic) could be integrated into the development of the range. HX models are based around commercial TG range components.

Rheinmetall MAN Military Vehicles (RMMV) For clarity, the HX range of trucks were developed and initially manufactured by MAN (Maschinenfabrik Augsburg-Nürnberg) Nutzfahrzeuge AG. The umbrella corporation making them is now is Rheinmetall MAN Military Vehicles (RMMV). RMMV resulted from the 2010 merger of the military truck branch of the former MAN Nutzfahrzeuge AG with Rheinmetall's wheeled military vehicle branch. Under the terms of the agreement, Rheinmetall had a stake of 51%, and MAN 49% in the new company.

In July 2019, Rheinmetall announced that the company was pursuing a buyback of some shares held by MAN Truck & Bus in the RMMV joint venture (JV) company, specifically 100% of shares in the tactical vehicle segment of the business. As of September 2019, RMMV (which remains a 51/49% JV) only produces military and militarised trucks, with tactical vehicles now produced by Vehicle System Division Europe (VSE), which itself is part of the larger the Rheinmetall Landsysteme GmbH (RLS).

MAN is now part of the Volkswagen-owned Traton Group, along with Scania and International Motors LLC (previously Navistar).

== Description (HX/HX2) ==
The HX range (HX-HX3) of trucks are essentially the continuance of the earlier FX and LX range concept, this the combination of commercial driveline and chassis with a modular military-specific cab.

The original HX range are based on chassis and driveline components from the heavier elements of MAN's commercial TG WorldWide heavy truck range which was first introduced in 2000. The HX2 range, while retaining the use of commercial automotive components, is based on a purpose-designed chassis. Official details of the HX3 range remain limited, but the type can be considered a further development of the HX2 range. Limited available details of the HX3 are included in a separate sub-section.

The HX range is continually evolving throughout its production run, and while there have been three defined generations (HX and HX2 produced; HX3 pending) there have also been incremental improvements and range additions within generations that have not resulted in any formal designation change or revision.

The designation system most commonly applied to HX range trucks is that of MAN/RMMVs internal model designation. There is no sequencing within model designations, and from the three original HX models released, the HX60 was a 4×4 chassis, the HX58 was a 6×6 chassis, and the HX77 an 8×8 chassis. On HX2 range models an additional M (Military) is included in model designation, while the HX is dropped from individual model nomenclature. The current HX2 designations are 40M (4×4), 42M (6×6), 44M (8×8), and 45M (10x×0). There is also the HX81, a Heavy Equipment Transporter (HET) that is technically a HX/HX2 hybrid. Designations for HX3 models have yet to be released.

In addition to internal model designation each model has technical designation nomenclature that is broadly comparable to that of MAN's commercial product line. The base designation identifies permissible gross vehicle weight and engine power output, the latter figure rounded to the nearest 10 hp (7.457 kW). For example, the HX range model 18.330 has a technically permissible gross vehicle weight rating of 18,000 kg and an engine power output of 326 hp (243 kW). Until the Bundeswehr's WLS UTF/GTF awards these designations did not appear on the trucks themselves, and for the first time there are derivations of internal model designations with the 44M being available as the 38.450 (unprotected configuration) and 41.450 (protected configuration).

The base designation is then expanded by the addition of a short sequence of letters that are not displayed on the vehicle. Retaining the earlier mentioned 18.330 as an example, this is a two-axle all-wheel drive truck (4×4) with leaf spring suspension front and rear (BB; B = Blattfederung/leaf suspension). In the case of tractor trucks, an additional S (BBS) denotes tractor truck configuration (S = Sattelzugmaschinen/tractor unit).

HX trucks are of a conventional design and are based on a single piece C-section ladder-frame chassis of profiles determined by a mix of GVWR, intended usage, and configuration. The original HX range use chassis from the heavier elements of MAN's commercial TG WorldWide heavy truck range. For the HX2 range a purpose-designed chassis with 400 mm of torsional twist is used. Wheelbase options for the HX range are extensive, the range including two-, three-, four-, and five-axle chassis.

Gross vehicle weights (GVWs) range from 18,000 kg for a 4×4 chassis to 50,000 kg for a five-axle chassis, with the HX81 8×8 tractor truck having a gross combination weight (GCW) of up to 130,000 kg. Payload varies by role and configuration, but for rigid chassis actual maximum load on chassis ranges from around 8,000 kg to 30,000 kg. In certain instances, and particularly with single-tyred axles, GVW ratings can be restricted.

HX trucks are fitted with MAN/RMMV's modular military-specific cab, this tracing back to the Category 1 trucks that entered service in 1976. The evolution of this cab used for HX models is 290 mm deeper than preceding designs, and has more than 600 litres of gross stowage space in the rear. The interior of the walk-through cab is primarily steel or washable plastic/vinyl. Two types of modular detachable hard-top roof are available, a standard flat roof or a version with extended height for the optional air-conditioning equipment, plus an NBC filtration system for the over-pressured IAC cab option if required. The reinforced roof can take the weight of two soldiers and the recoil forces of a 12.7 mm heavy machine gun in a ring-mount. A riot protection kit is available for the cab.

To meet increasing demands for crew protection on deployed operations the HX range was designed from the outset with protection options in mind. Appliqué protection kits, for which vehicles are prepared to accept at the production stage, were developed for the cab. Known as the Modular Armour Cabin (MAC), these kits offer protection according to STANAG 4569. Weight of these kits is about 1,500 kg and the hard-top remains removable for air-transport if required. A swap-cab armouring solution known as the Integrated Armour Cabin (IAC) is also available. The IAC was originally developed in conjunction with Krauss-Maffei Wegmann (KMW) for the SX range of trucks, this is suited to models with twin front axles only. A Rheinmetall-developed IAC option is available, this is suitable for all HX range trucks, depending on front axle rating and protection levels.

MAN water-cooled diesel engines of various power outputs and emissions compliance are used across the range. The four primary engines used are the D0836, D2066, D2676, and D2868. All engines are qualified for operation with F34 fuel, and across the range power outputs vary from 326 hp (243 kW ) for a EURO 4 or 5 emissions compliant version of the six-cylinder 6.871-litre D0836 fitted to the HX60, to 680 hp (507 kW) for a EURO 5 emissions compliant version of the V10 18.273-litre D2868, this fitted to the HX81 heavy equipment transporter. Emissions compliance options are dependent on engine model, build year, and territory, but are currently EURO 2 or EURO 5, the latter requiring fuel additives.

The engine remains in the conventional position (longitudinally between the chassis rails) but the cooling pack has been moved transversally to the rear of the cab where it is better protected from damage and the radiator is less prone to getting clogged up when driving off-road. It also allows for a larger radiator for extended hot climate capability.

A ZF AS-Tronic automated constant mesh gearbox (branded TipMatic in MAN's commercial product line up) with 12 forward and two reverse gears was originally standard fit. Model dependent this could be either the AS Mid (HX60/HX61), AS Tronic (HX58/HX77), or TC Tronic (HX81). For higher GVWs, including the HX81 HET, the addition of a torque convertor in the driveline is optional.

For HX2 models, the 40M 4×4 retains the AS Mid gearbox, and while the 42M 6×6 and 44M 8×8 originally retained the AS Tronic, this is now superseded by the 12F/2R automated TraXon gearbox. The 45M 10×10 is fitted as standard with a ZF Ecolife seven-speed automated transmission with torque convertor and primary retarder, this an option for the 42M and 44M. As a further option, a fully automatic transmission can be fitted to most models. All HX models feature a MAN two-speed transfer case, with a neutral position an option for the transfer case.

Drive axles are MAN single tyre hub-reduction, and with the exception of the heavier tractor units which are full-time all-wheel drive for traction and torque distribution reasons, all models have selectable front wheel drive. All axles have cross-axle differential locks and there are longitudinal differential locks in rear (and front on 8×8 and 10×10 chassis) axle combinations and the transfer case. Axle weight ratings are 9000 kg or 11,000 kg for front axles, and 13,000 kg for rear axles with single wheels/tyres.

Front steer-drive axles (including the 2nd axle on 8×8/10×10 chassis) are sprung by a combination of parabolic leaf springs with progressively acting rubber assistors and hydraulic telescopic shock absorbers. Steering is ZF hydraulically actuated and steering lock on the front axle is 36°, steering lock on the second axle is 18°. On the five-axle 45M the rearmost axle contra-steers. Rear axles are sprung by inverted multi-leaf trapezoidal springs with a radius rod and an anti-roll bar. A conventional rear bogie set-up is employed for 6×6 and 8×8 chassis. The 45M 10×10 features hydropneumatic suspension for the three rearmost axles. Anti-roll bars are fitted front and/or rear on an as-required basis.

The standard 14.00 R 20 tyres may be replaced by 395/85 R 20, 525/65 R 20 or 16.00 R 20 tyres if required. On heavy tractor trucks, a 24 R 21 option exists for rear axles. Tyre chains for all tyre sizes up to 16.00 R 20 are permitted. A central tyre inflation system (CTIS) or semi-automatic tyre inflation system (STIS) and run-flat inserts are options.

All models can climb a 60% gradient, traverse a 40% sideslope, and have an approach angle of 40 degrees. Fording was initially 750 mm of water without preparation, this increasing to 1.5 m with preparation. For HX2 models this increased to a standard 1.5 m without additional preparation. Climatic operational range is from -32 °C to +49 °C without additional preparation, with -46 °C an option.

With the exception of the modular military cab, the location of the cooling pack and a small number of military specific ancillary items and modifications, for cost efficiency reasons RMMV has strived for maximum commonality with the TG commercial product.

HX3

The HX3 was unveiled in May 2021. Like it predecessors, the HX3 is designed for purpose and is classed a military-off-the-shelf (MOTS) product. The HX3 will be available in 4×4, 6×6, 8×8, and 10×10 configurations, with the 8×8 and 10×10 options available with active rear suspension and rear-axle steer options. A fully Automated Load Handling System (ALHS) and Universal Torsion-Resistant Subframe (UTRS) will further enhance capability in the traditional logistics role, while the Artillery Truck Interface (ATI) will enable the 10×10 to be utilised as the basis for various artillery or similar systems.

The HX3 remains based around militarised MAN commercial components, with new safety features carried across from the commercial product including Emergency Brake Assist (EBA), Adaptive Cruise Control (ACC) and Lane Departure Warning (LDW), all of these disconnectable for tactical applications. EURO 5 engines are standard, these compatible with military grade fuels following limited modifications. For consistent use on lower grade fuels (up to 5000 ppm sulfur), a EURO 2 engine option is an option, and for users requiring current European emissions compliance a EURO 6 option is also available. Autonomous driving options will also be available.

The flat-paneled military cab of the HX/HX2 models has been redesigned for the HX3. A new single piece flat mine blast protecting floor is used, this allowing for standard commercial seats to be used for the crew, these with five-point harnesses if required. Air-conditioning is now relocated from the roof to within the new dashboard assembly, the compressed air cylinders now moved from the chassis frame rails to the roof. All stowage boxes are watertight, the HX3 capable of fording in up to 1.5 m of salt water. Other off-road performance criteria includes a vertical step of 590 mm and an approach angle of 40 degrees. The HX3-specific chassis frame allows for up to 400 mm of torsional twist.

== World record attempt - Chile ==
On 6 November 2017, Rheinmetall announced the company was a main sponsor for high-altitude record-breaking attempt that had commenced that day. Using two HX range trucks (a 340 hp 4×4 40M and a 440 hp 6×6 58) the expedition aimed to reach the highest point on earth accessible to motor vehicles – the 6890 m-tall Ojos del Salado, the world's highest active volcano, located on the border of Chile and Argentina. In order to set a new world record the vehicles would have to reach an altitude of at least 6,690 metres above sea level.

On 19 December it was announced the altitude record attempt had been called off at a height of 6,150 m for a combination of factors, including an insurmountable rock barrier and adverse weather conditions. The team had, however, built two refuge huts during their ascent, the highest of these built at 6,100 m, a record.

== Gallery ==
Rheinmetall MAN Military Vehicles (RMMV) HX range of tactical trucks; HX, HX2 & HX3

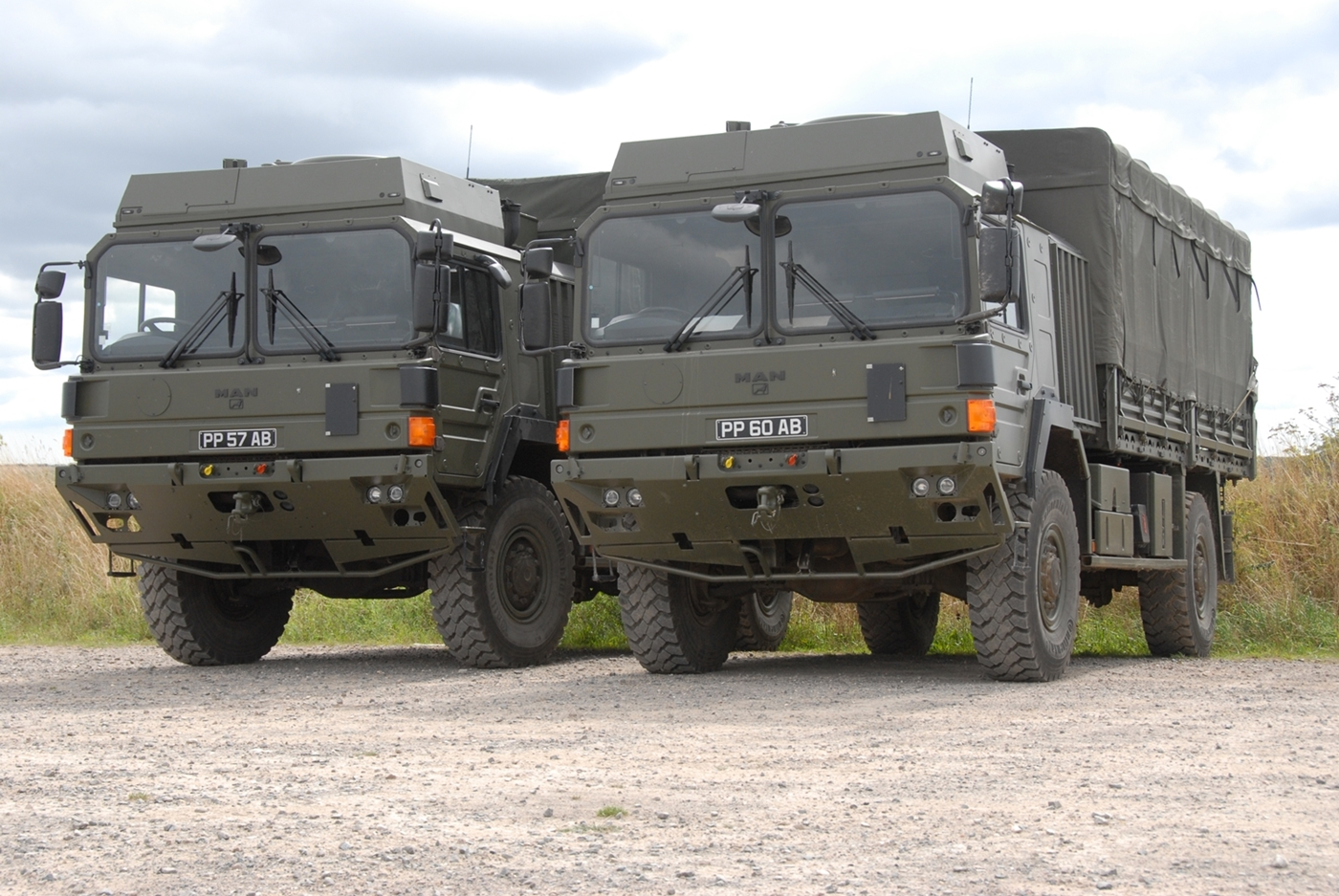
On Salisbury Plain training area, two British Army HX60 4×4 trucks in General Service configuration

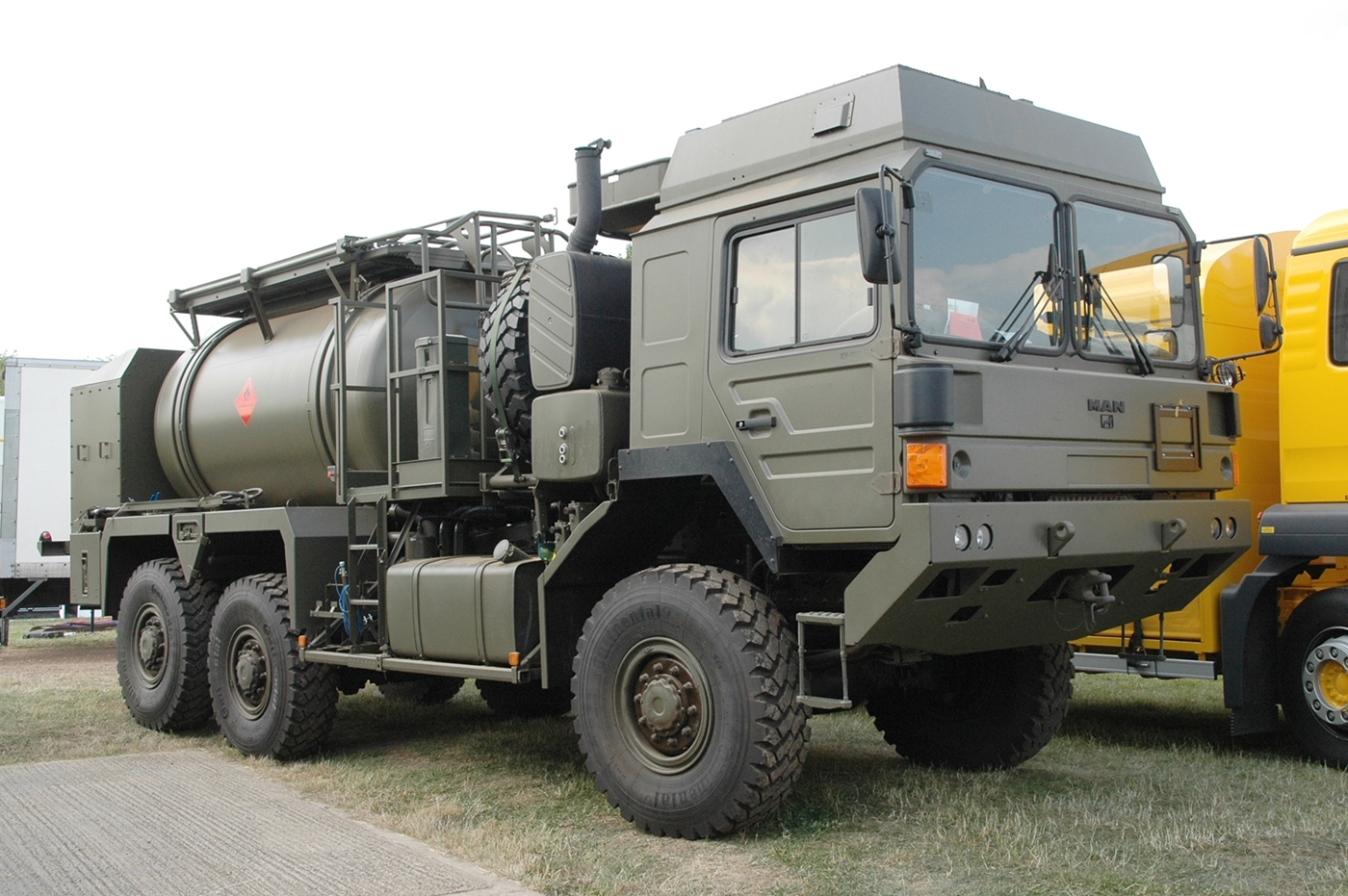
A British Army HX58 6×6 Unit Support Tanker (UST); tank and pumping equipment is supplied by Fluid Transfer Ltd

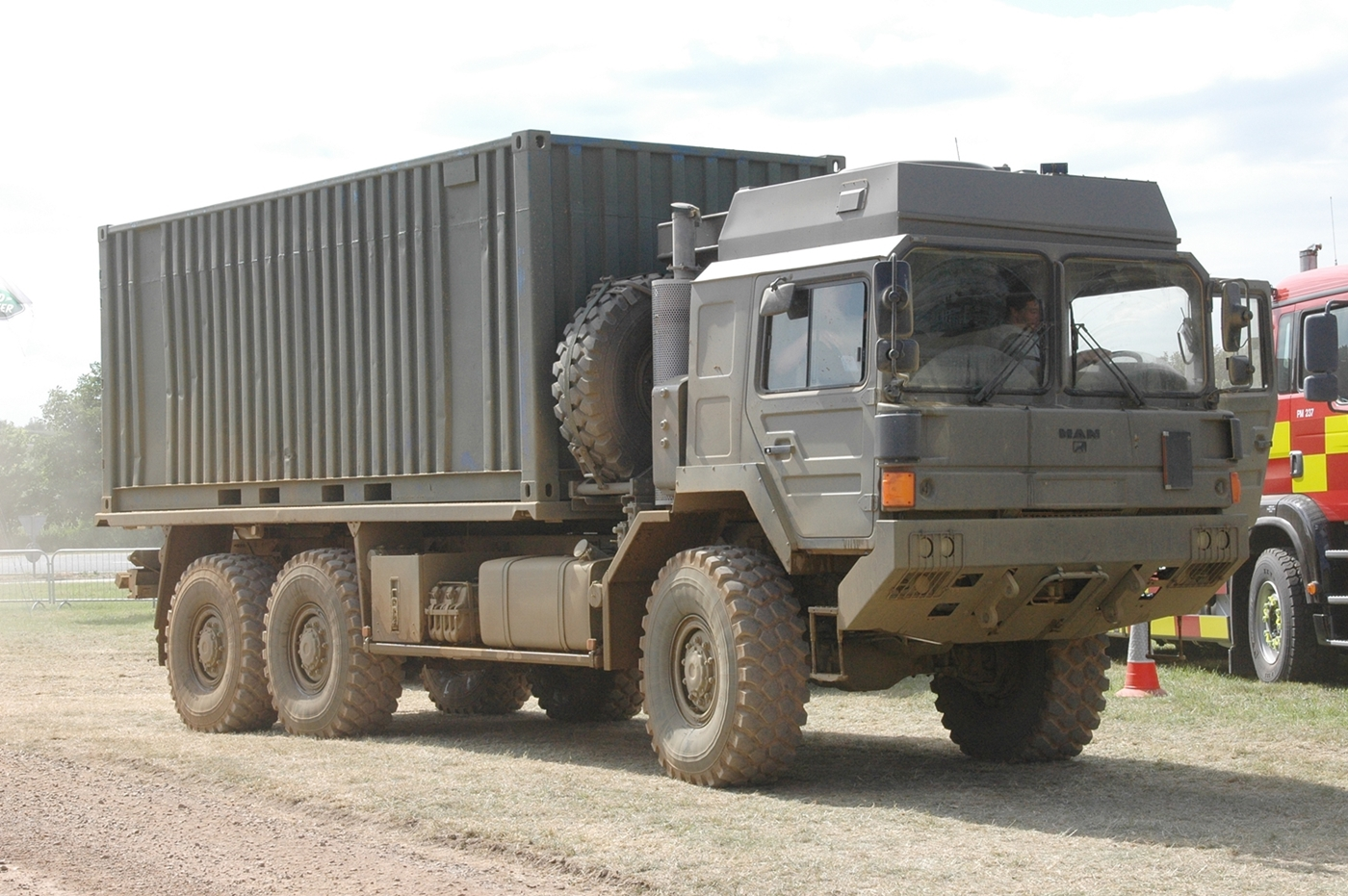
An HX58 6×6 with revisions including larger 16.00 R 20 tyres and an automatic transmission for a stalled South African requirement

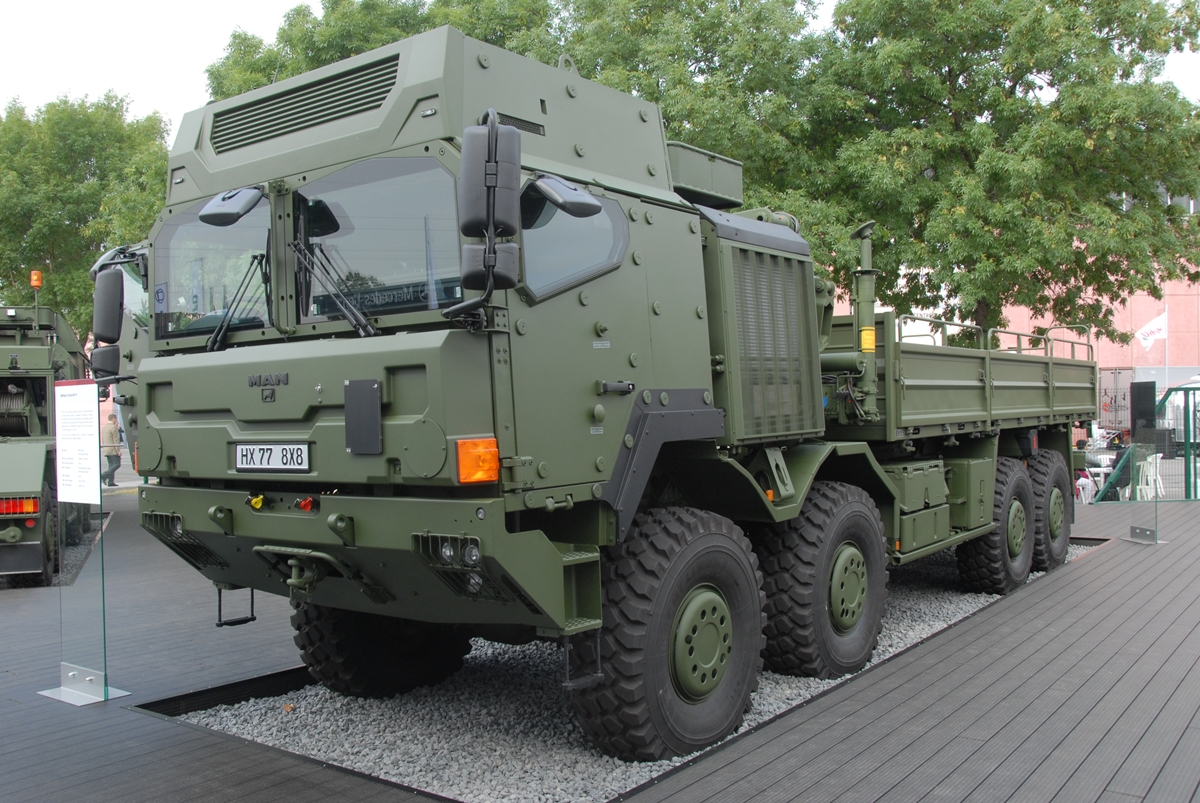
At Eurosatory, a HX77 with RMMV MAC protected cabin

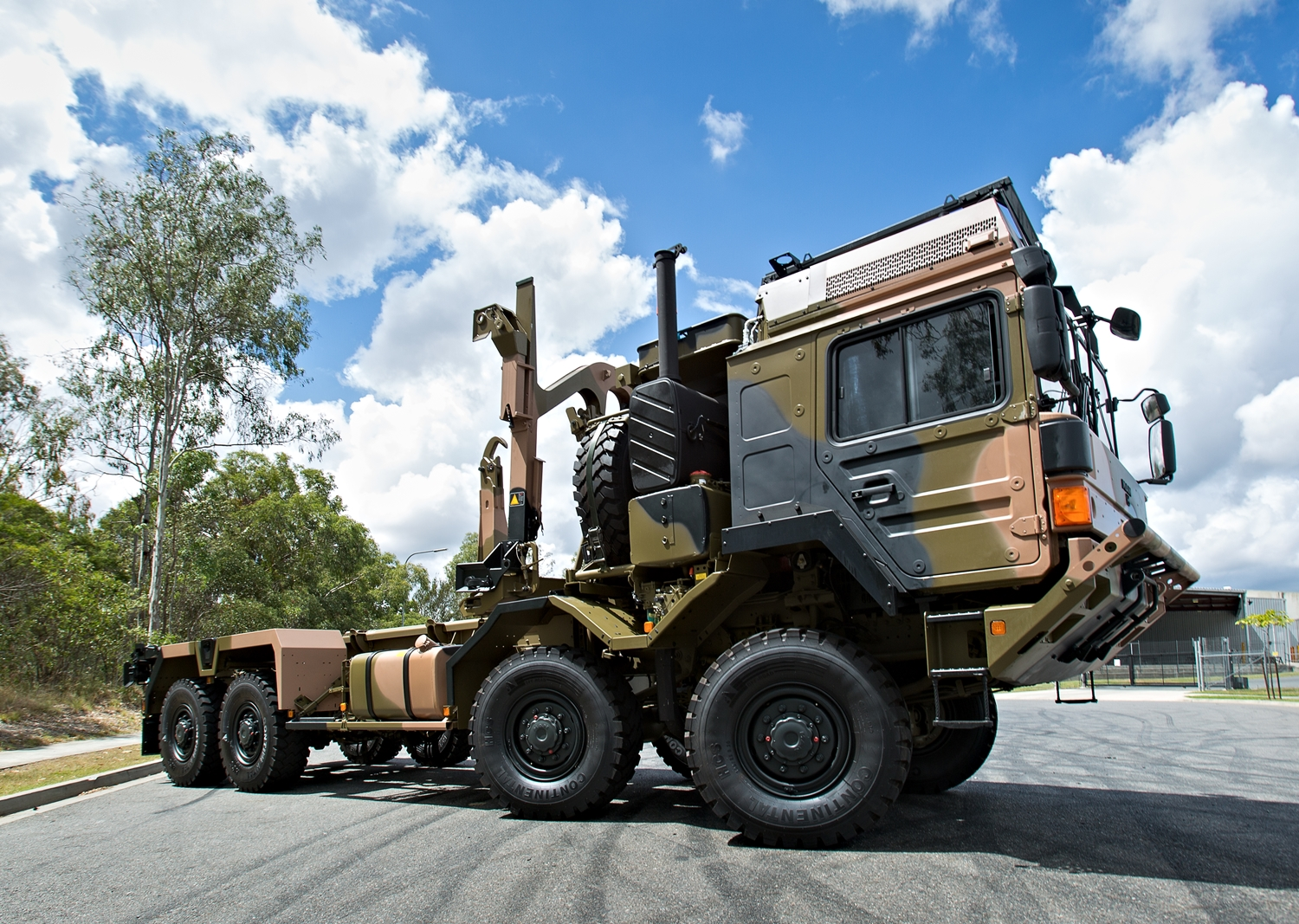
A HX77 with LHS and CHU, one of the first 12 LAND 121 vehicles to be handed over to the Australian Army during 2016

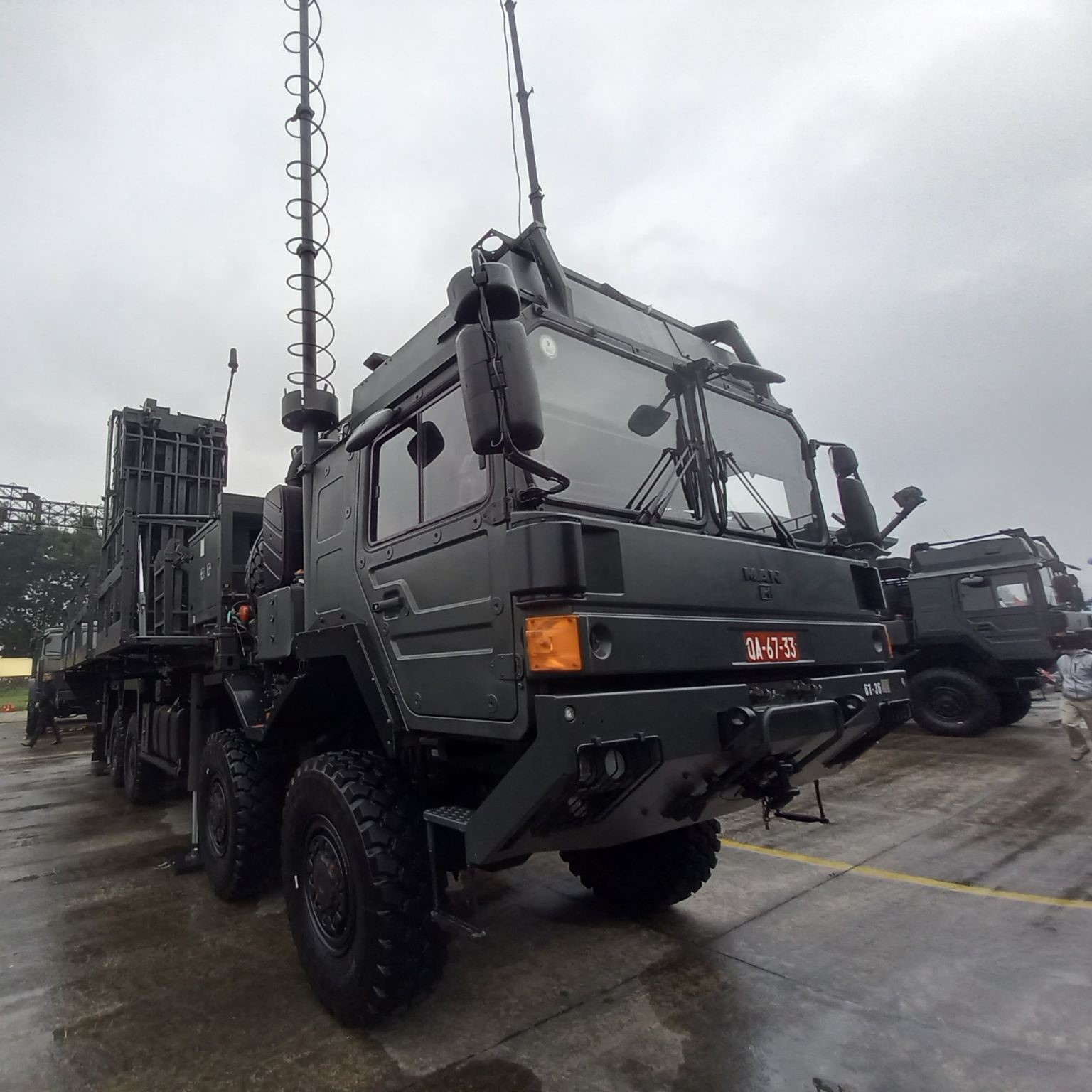
A Vietnamese SPYDER battery using the HX as the standard chassis

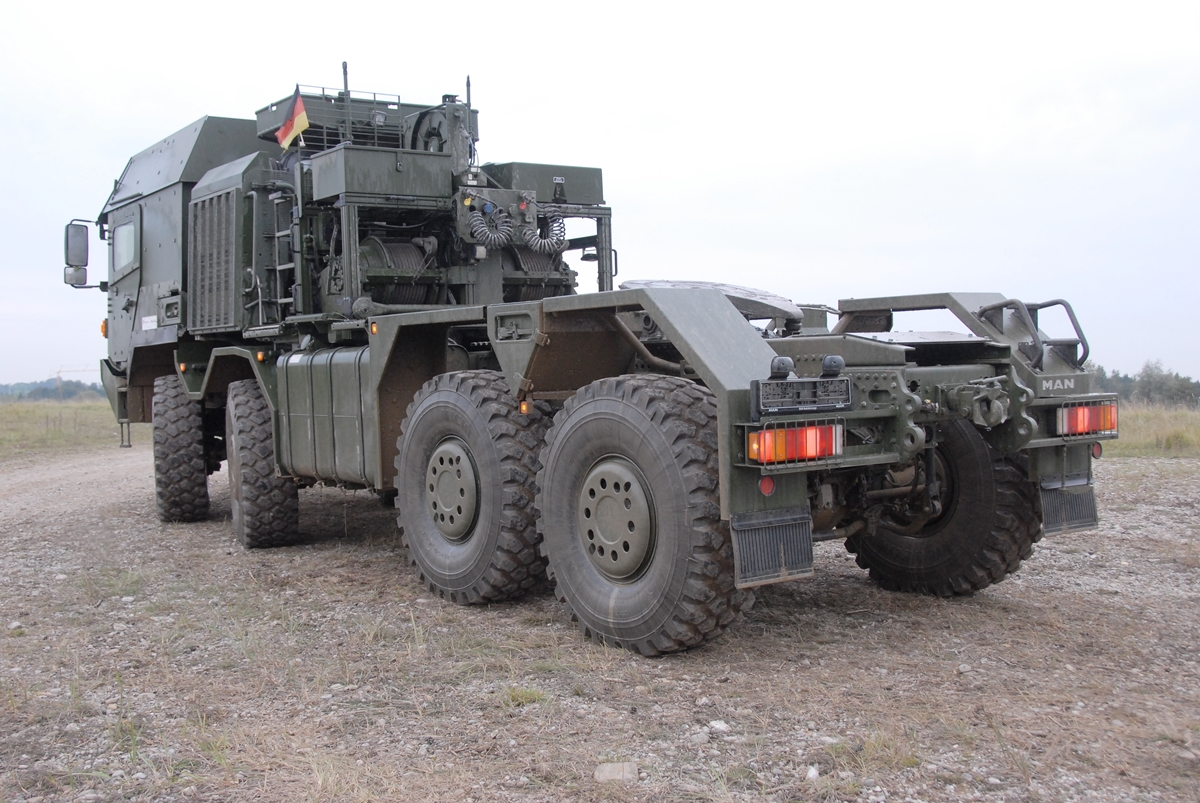
Rear three-quarter shot showing winch assembly of an HX81 8×8 HET with IAC

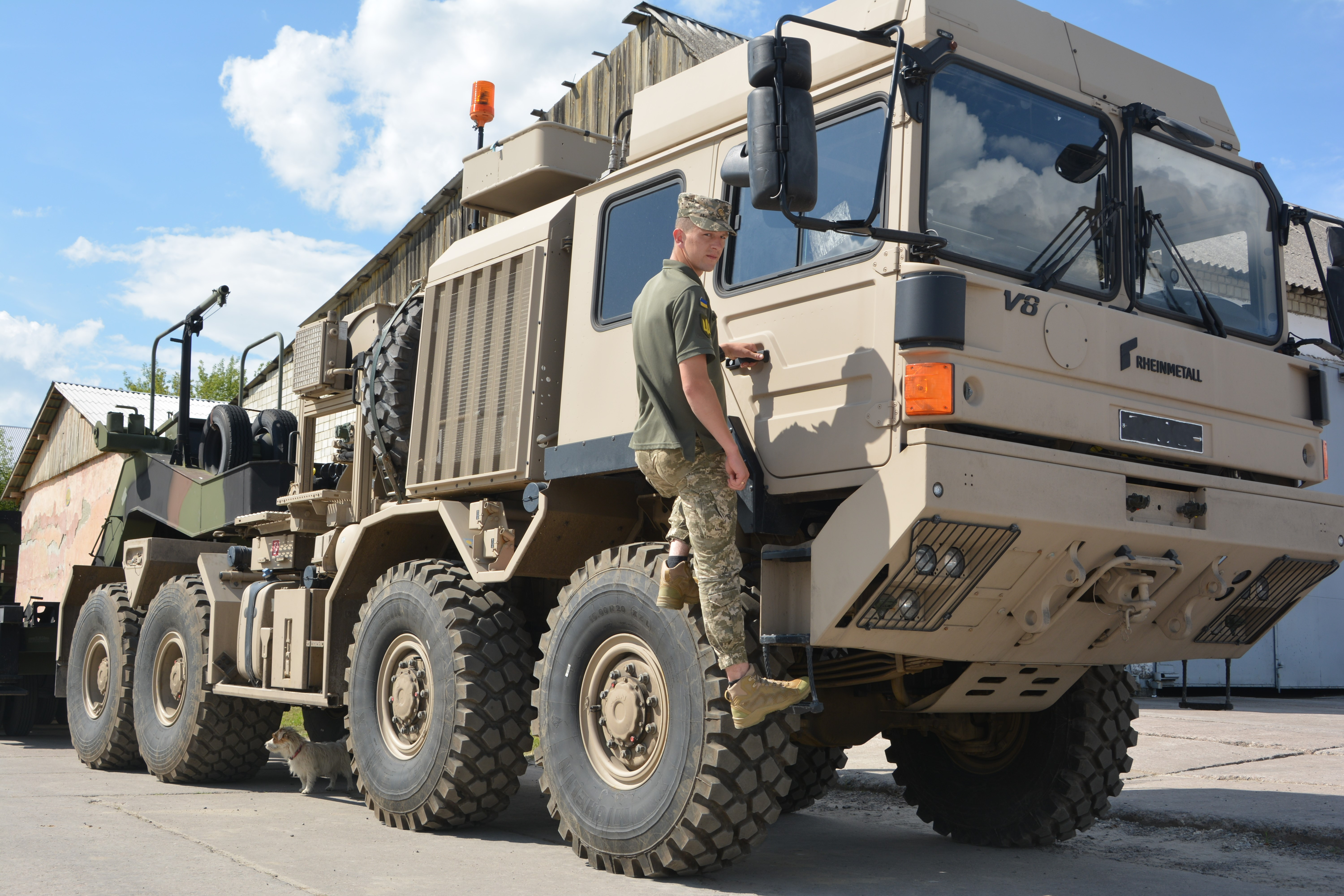
Photographed in 2023, a RMMV HX81 HET from the batch originally destined for Saudi Arabia stated to be in use in Ukraine

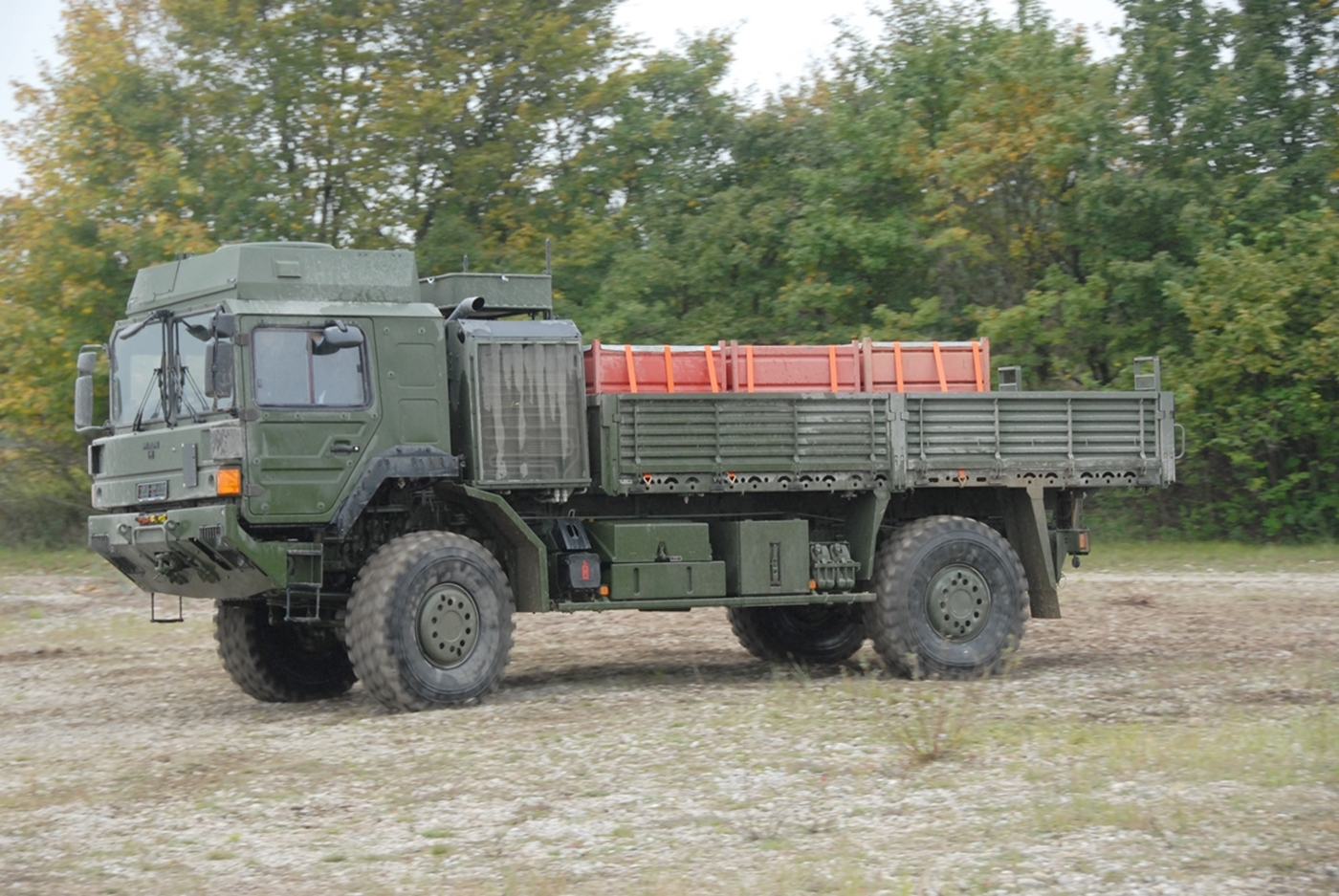
An early HX2 40M at a RMMV media demonstration in Germany

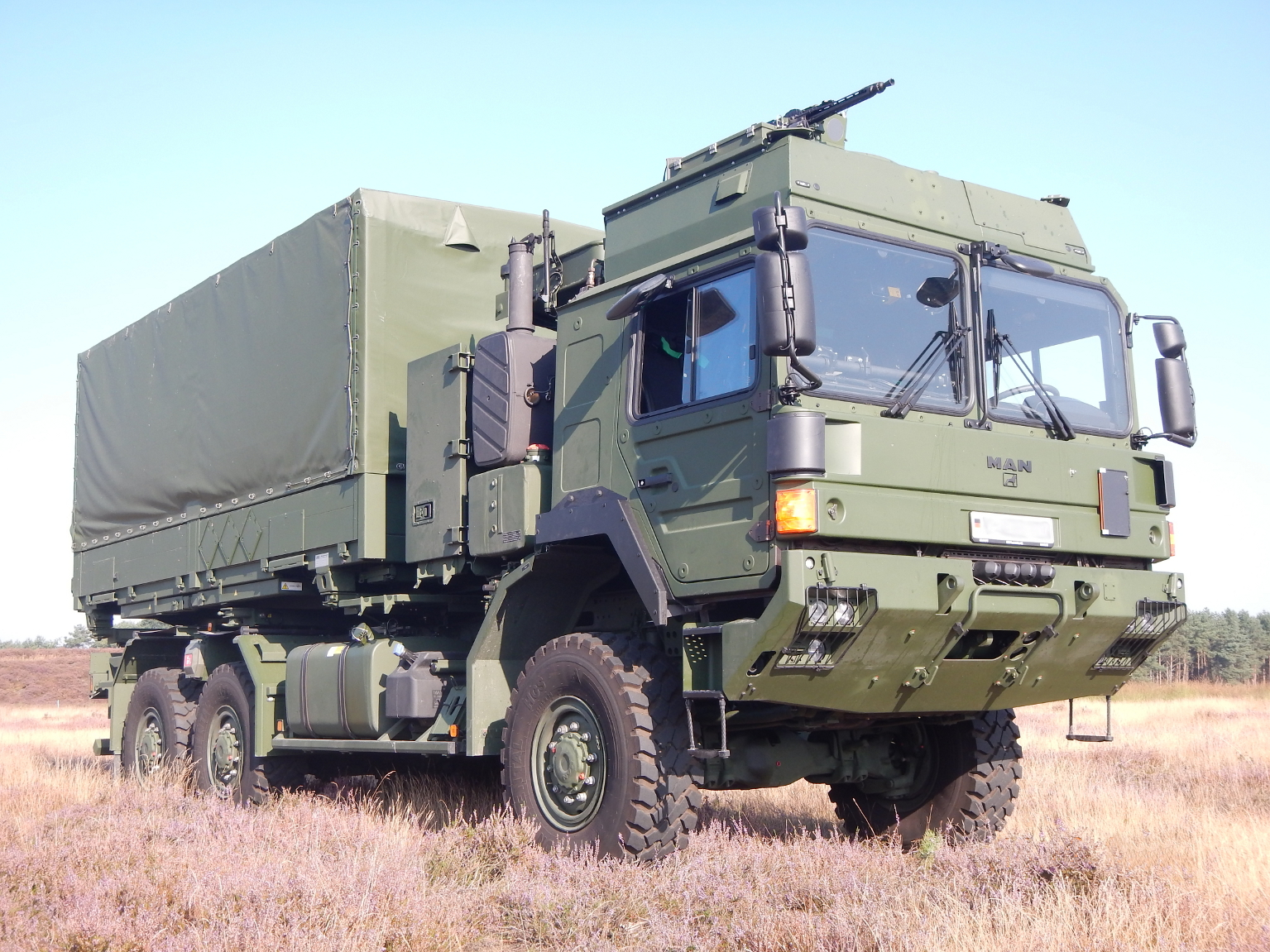
A 42M 6×6 during German Bundeswehr UTF trials

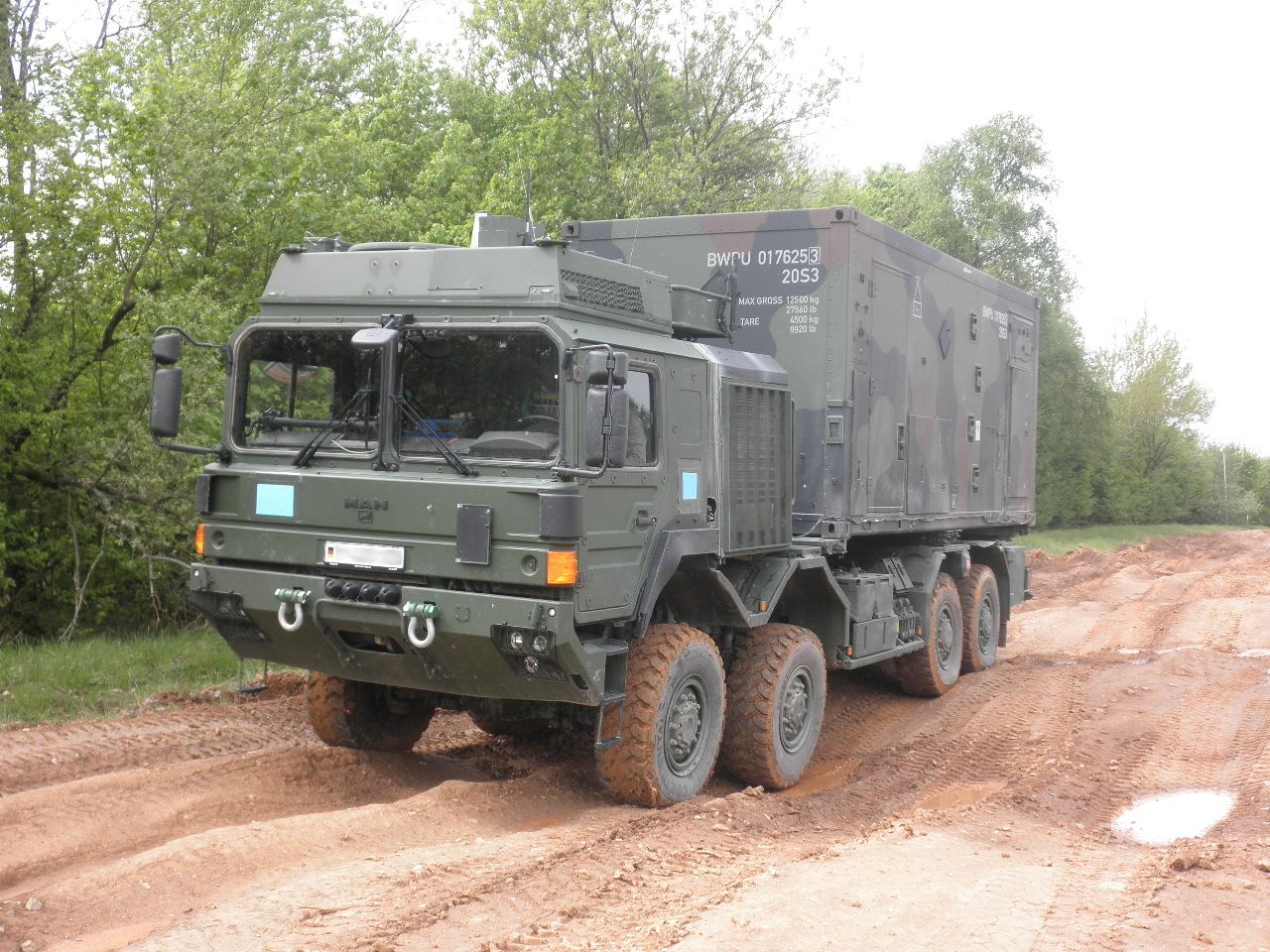
A 44M 8×8 during German Bundeswehr UTF trials

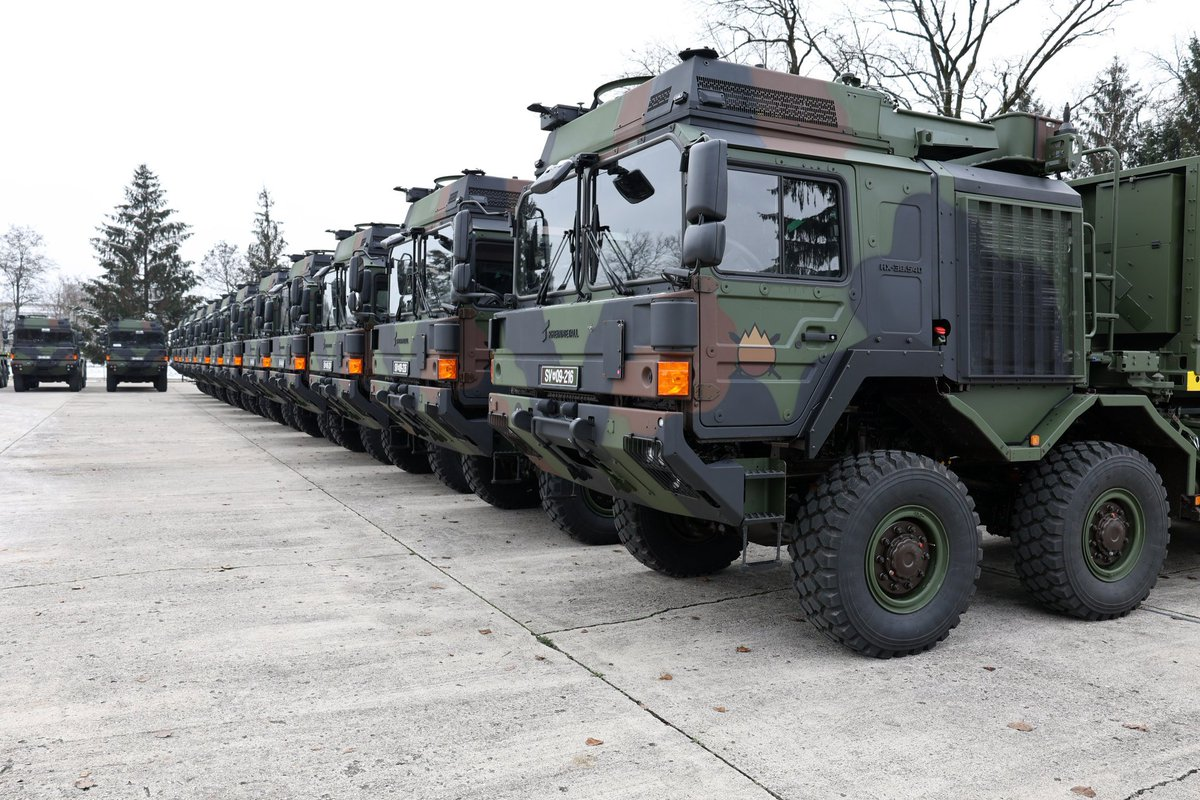
44M 8×8 of the Slovenian Army. As later production trucks, these carry HX38.540 nomenclature

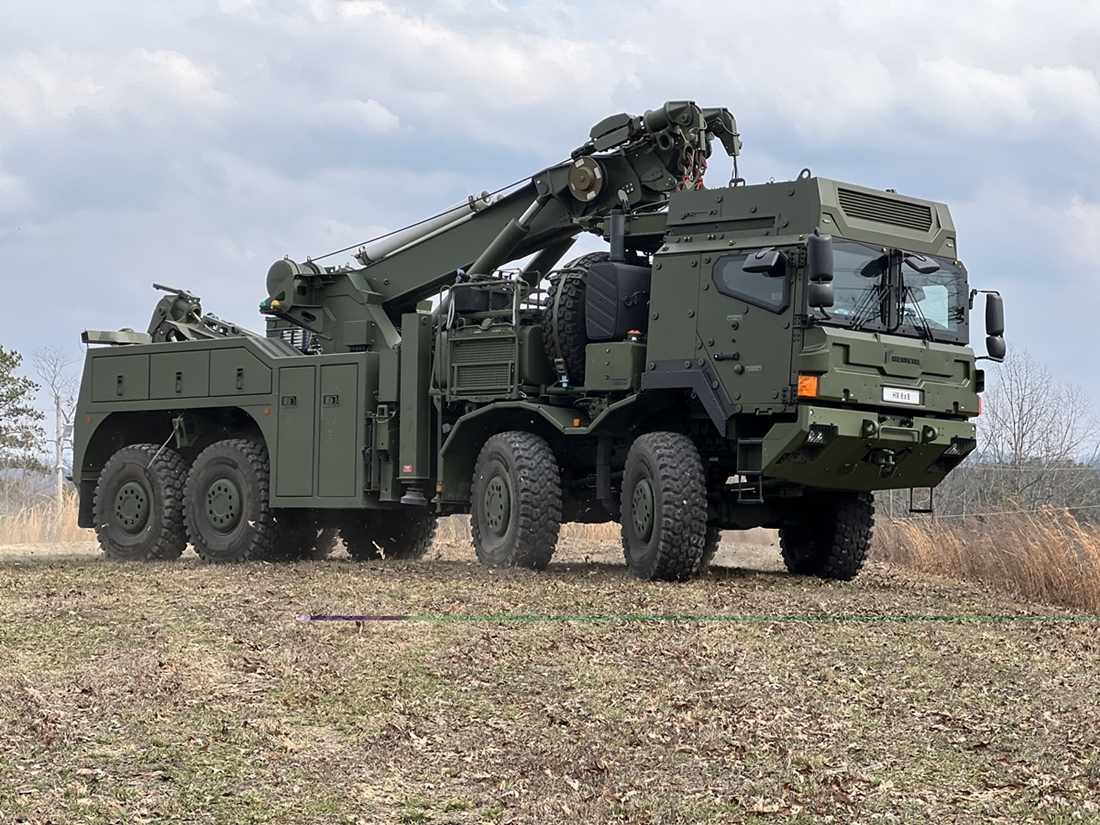
44M in Canadian ERC configuration

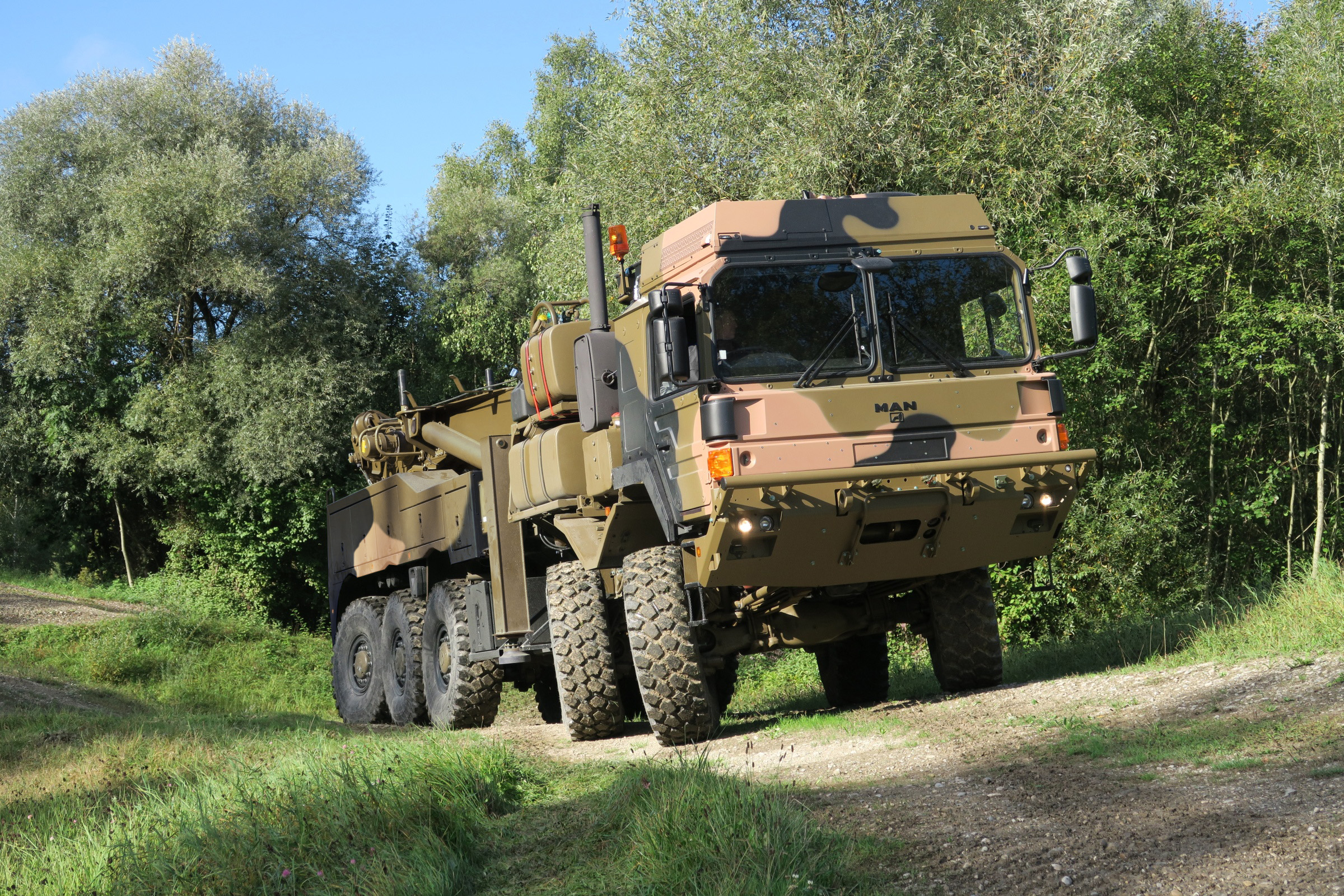
An Australian 45M 10×10 configured as a heavy recovery vehicle

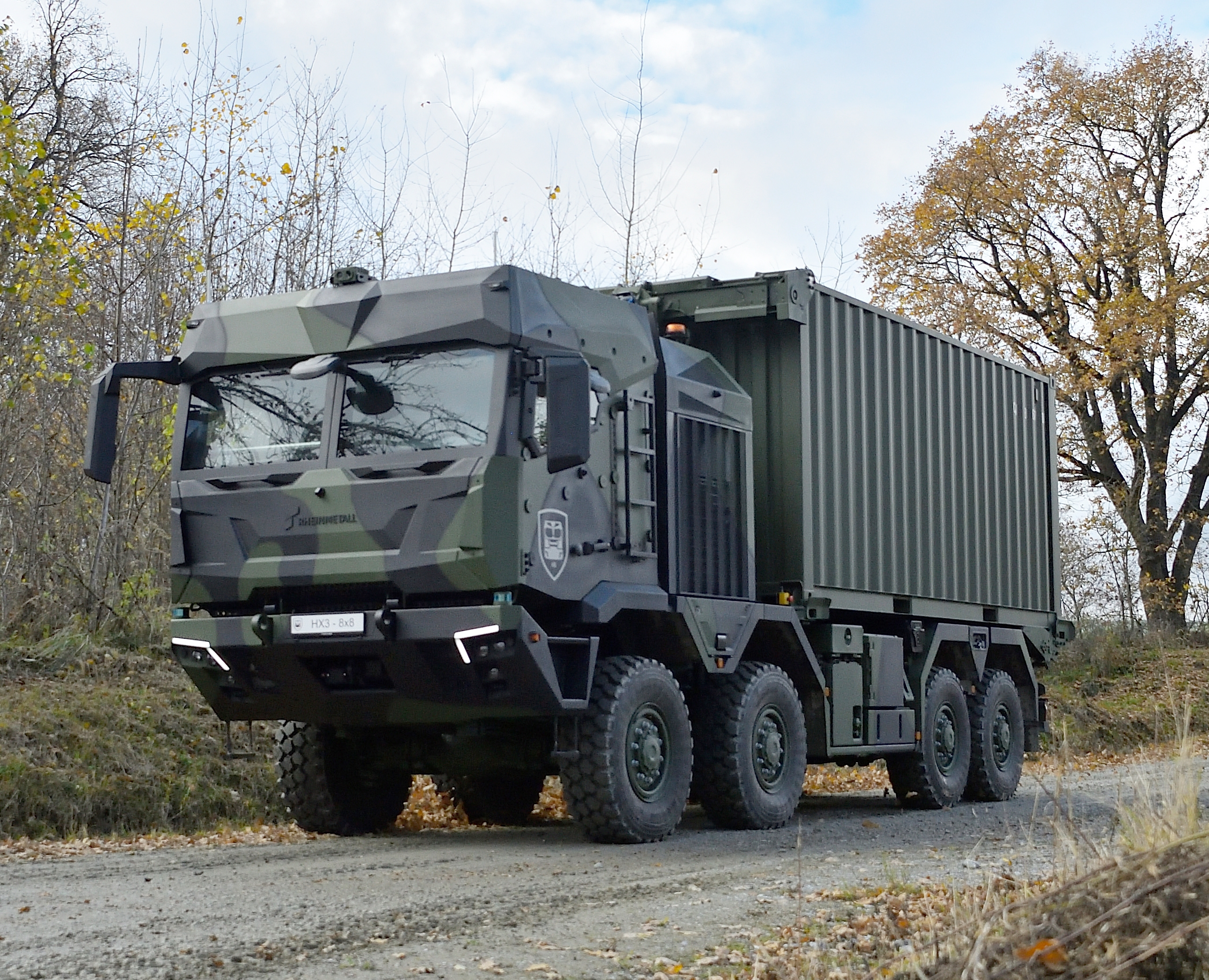
On 6 May 2021 Rheinmetall unveiled the HX3 which will available in 4×4, 6×6, 8×8, and 10×10 configurations

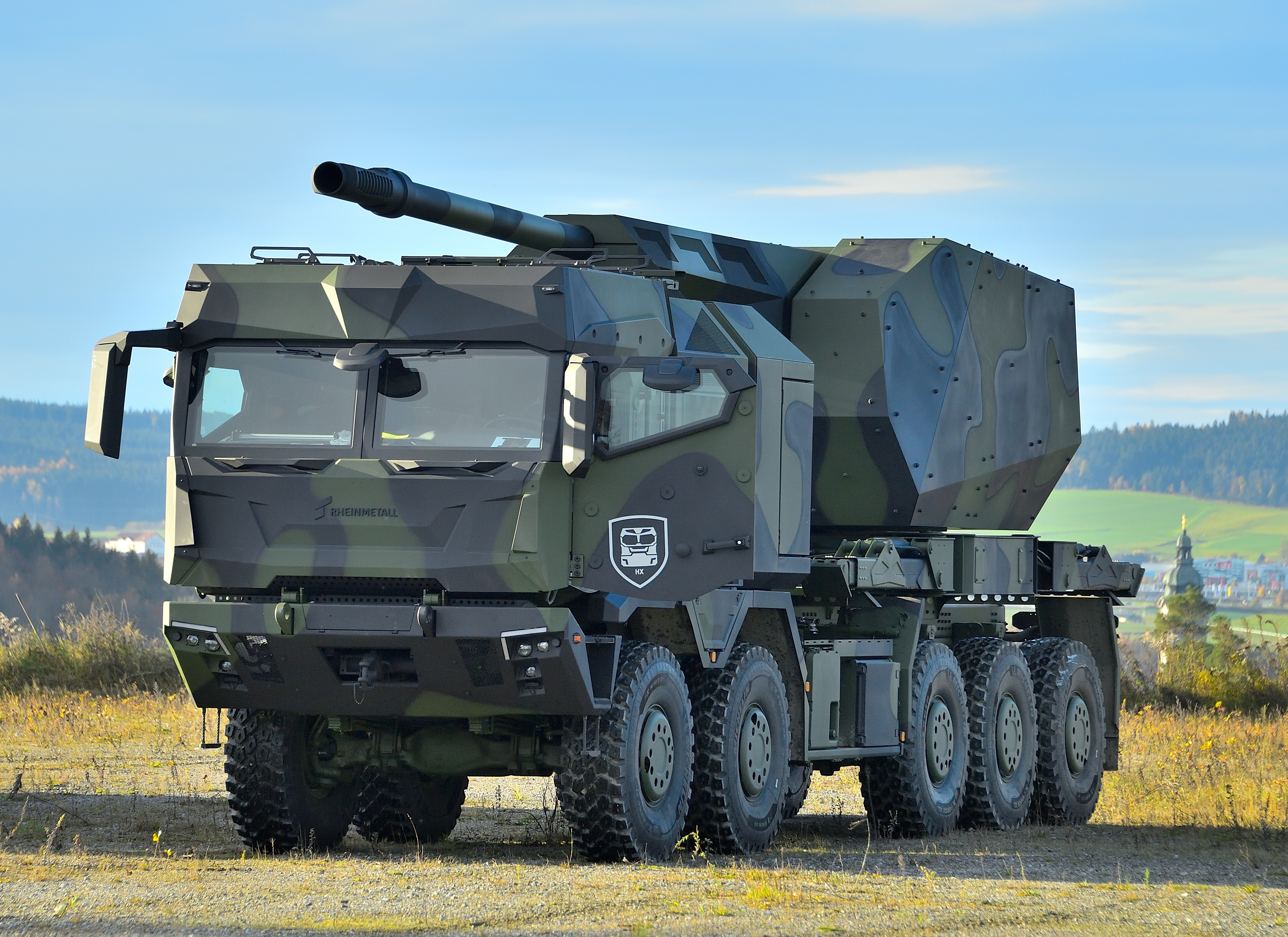
With the new Artillery Truck Interface (ATI) the 10×10 HX3 could be utilised in future as a basis for various artillery or similar systems

== Operators ==
=== Germany ===
Model	Image	Origin	Type	Number	Notes
SLT Mammut Schwerlasttransporter Mammut		Austria	Tank transporter Armoured cabin	19*	The Leopard 2A7V required a tank transporter with an increased payload capability.: 19 (12 ordered 2011; 7 ordered 2025) *(21 - an initial 2 qualification vehicles were ordered following trials that concluded during 2006)
Rheinmetall HX81 tractorAlso known as "Elefant 2", And in the Bundeswehr, known as:"SaZgM", or "Sattelzugmaschine"		Austria	Tank transporter Unprotected cabin	80 + 57 on order	Framework for up to 137 vehicles signed in 2018.: 32 ordered in 2018; 48 ordered in November 2020; 57 ordered in May 2023.
RMMV HX-38.540 - MULTI 2 WLS UTF 8×8 (unarmoured) Wechselladersysteme Ungeschütztes Transportfahrzeug, ZLK 15t, 8×8 RMMV HX-41.540 - MULTI 2 WLS GTF 8×8 (armoured) Wechselladersysteme Geschütztes Transportfahrzeug, ZLK 15t, 8×8	WLS UTF (unarmoured): WLS GTF (armoured):	Austria Germany	Tactical truck with hydraulic hooklift hoist (for 20 ft ISO interfaces)	1,008 2,841 ordered (1,066 UTF + 1,785 GTF)	Successor of the MULTI A1.1 and the MAN KAT1. Framework agreement: June 2020, 4,000 swap body trucks for €2 billion valid until 2027; Truck orders: Tranche 1, June 2020, 540 trucks (310 UTF, 230 GTF); Tranche 2, June 2023, 367 trucks (203 UTF, 164 GTF); Tranche 3, June 2024, 1,515 trucks (265 UTF, 1,250 GTF); Tranche 4, November 2024, 200 trucks (180 UTF, 20 GTF); Tranche 5, December 2024, 219 trucks (98 UTF, 121 GTF); Platform orders:a s of November 2024: 3,421 swap-loading platforms; 2,820 tarpaulin / bow superstructures; Deliveries: May 2022, 1st truck; June 2023, > 600 trucks; June 2024: 1,008 trucks; 2,921 swap bodies and 2,320 tarpaulin and bow bodies; Equipment: HIAB hooklift Multilift MSH-165-CL; NBC protection; Rheinmetall ROSY smoke system; Can receive FLW 100 RCWS
RMMV 42M - UTF mil 6×6 Ungeschütztes Transportfahrzeug, ZLK 5t, 42M 6×6 RMMV 44M - UTF mil 8×8 Ungeschütztes Transportfahrzeug, ZLK 15t, 44M 8×8	6×6: 8×8	Austria	Unarmoured tactical truck	3,271 (1,987 6×6 + 1,284 8×8)	Successor of the MAN KAT1. The production took place at the plant in Vienna with mostly German parts for the RMMV HX2 family. This truck was ordered through two framework agreements: July 2017, 2,271 trucks for €900 million; January 2020, 1,000 trucks, for €389 million; Orders within the framework for the 6×6: Tranche 1, July 2017, 558; Tranche 2, May 2019, 252; Tranche 3, November 2019, 60; Tranche 4, January 2020, 675; Tranche 5, January 2021, 292; Tranche 6, January 2021, 150; Orders within the framework for the 8×8: Tranche 4, January 2020: 325; Tranche 5, January 2021, 109; Tranche 6, January 2021, 850; Deliveries: Initiated in 2018; 1,250 delivered by June 2020; 3000th delivered by May 2022; Last delivered by June 2023; Equipment: Can receive FLW 100 RCWS
RMMV HX40M - UTF mil 4×4 Ungeschütztes Transportfahrzeug, ZLK 3.5t, HX40M 4×4 RMMV HX42M - UTF mil 6×6 Ungeschütztes Transportfahrzeug, ZLK 5t, HX42M 6×6 RMMV HX44M - UTF mil 8×8 Ungeschütztes Transportfahrzeug, ZLK 15t, HX44M 8×8	4×4: 6×6: 8×8	Austria Germany	Unarmoured tactical truck	0 / 6,500	The production takes place at the plant in Vienna with mostly German parts for the RMMV HX2 family. Framework agreement for €3.5 billion for 6,500 trucks approved in June 2024. Orders through framework agreement: July 2024, 610 for €313 million; December 2024, 349 trucks approved for purchase (185 UTF mil 8×8, 164 UTF mil 6×6); Deliveries: 250 planned for 2024; Trucks to be equipped with command equipment, and capacity to easily install the RCWS FLW 100.

=== Other operators ===
Australia
2,536 HX models were ordered in July 2013 as the Phase 3B part of project Land 121. Australia was the first customer to receive HX2 variants. The first vehicle handover occurred on 7 April 2016, when 6 HX77 (8×8) and 6 40M (4×4) were handed over. In July 2018, a further 1,044 were ordered, as Land 121 Phase 5B, an extension of Phase 3B. In February 2020, an Initial Operating Capability for Phase 3B trucks was declared. In April 2021, around 800 trucks were left to build and deliver. Final deliveries occurred in 2024.
Austria
Just over 75 HX trucks with a framework contract in place from 2023. 20 HX77 8×8 configured with a load handling system and armoured cab were delivered in 2006. 20 42M 6×6 and four HX81 HETs were ordered around 2017/2018. Five 44M 8×8 (2 x TEP 90; 3 x heavy recovery) were on order as of 2019. 24 medium recovery vehicles (mittleres Bergefahrzeug HX2 (mBgeFzg)) were delivered in 2022. Austria's Bundesbeschaffung GmbH Wien procurement organisation signed a seven-year framework agreement in May 2023 for up to 1,375 vehicles, with a potential order value of up to EUR525 million. The agreement allows for the delivery of HX range trucks plus TG MIL (TGM and TGS).
Canada
In November 2024, Canada's Enhanced Recovery Capability (ERC) requirement was awarded to Rheinmetall Canada. The award includes two contracts, a five-year purchase agreement valued at $325 million CAD for 85 heavy recovery trucks and 24 armoured cabs (with an option for additional orders), and an eight-year $30.4 million CAD support contract with options periods up to 16 years. The first trucks are to be delivered in 2027. The HX2 range trucks are 44M 8×8, equipped with a recovery package, based around a Miller 1050M rotator and a Rotzler TR200 capstan-type main winch, with a 25 tonne single line pull for 103 m of cable. The rotator is fitted with twin Tarvos TA15 drum winches, rated at 10 tonnes on the bottom layer and 6.6 tonnes on the top layer.
Colombia
Small quantity (possibly 2); system carrier.
Denmark
Just over 200 HX trucks to all branches of the armed forces from late 2006. Totals include 113 HX77 8×8 fitted with a load handling system, 83 HX77 8×8 in conventional cargo/tanker truck configurations, about five HX58 6×6 in tractor unit configuration to the Danish Air Force, and four HX60 4×4 in container/cargo configuration.
In November 2025, Denmark signed a framework agreement for up to 1,000 RMMV trucks, it includes RMMV TG MIL and RMMV HX2 trucks.
Egypt
HX2 44M are used as the basis of Egypt's IRIS-T SLM medium-range ground-based air defense (GBAD) missile system designed and manufactured by the German company Diehl. The initial production batch of this order was diverted to Ukraine.
Finland
A single ex-UK HX60 has been converted to left-hand drive (LHD) with a view to acquiring surplus UK HX60.
Hungary
Contract award to Rába. Production of Rába H-14, H-18, and H-25 trucks commenced in 2004, these initially locally designed chassis fitted with MAN engines, associated components including cooling system and the MAN modular military cab. Later production was HX CKD using some locally sourced components such as axles. About 300 examples were built using components supplied between 2004 and 2006, with a further 250 assembled from CKD kits delivered from 2007. Hungary also received around 80 RMMV HX77 8×8 trucks, plus around 40 44M and 45M HX2 models as support vehicles for Lynx and Leopard, plus system carrier roles.
Ireland
Five HX60 4×4 fitted with specialist EOD container bodies to the Army. Delivery of the latest two examples was announced on 22 August 2016.
Japan
Used for the chassis of Type 19 155 mm wheeled self-propelled howitzer. At least 44 8×8 chassis have been ordered since 2019, with a further 14 to be ordered in 2025.
Kosovo
10 purchased by the KSF. Five further examples donated by the German government. All WLS configuration and from German Army stock.
Kuwait
In July 2012 a sale of 83 HX60 4×4 trucks in cargo, water, and fuel tanker configurations to the Kuwait National Guard (KNG) was disclosed.
New Zealand
Under a Defence Force Land Transport Capability Programme project to replace an aged Medium and Heavy Operational Vehicle Fleet (MHOV), New Zealand received 194 HX range trucks. Also in service are four HX77 8×8 supplied from UK stocks.
Norway
The Norwegian Defence Logistics Organisation (NDLO) announced on 31 March 2014 it had signed two contracts with RMMV, an initial purchase contract and a through-life logistics support contract. Norway's initial order calls for about 120 HX2 and TG MIL range trucks, with HX2 variants accounting for the bulk of the order. It includes 95 HX 8×8 and eight 45M 10×10 recovery. First deliveries occurred during 2018. As of April 2021 around 250 HX range trucks were thought to have been ordered by Norway and Sweden combined. This is a framework agreement that includes Sweden and the original intention was to buy up to 2,000 military logistics vehicles before 2026.
Philippines
6 units delivered in 2024 WFEL Dry Support Bridges mounted on Rheinmetall MAN Military Vehicle (RMMV) 45M 10×10 heavy duty off-road military trucks acquired as part of the Philippine Army's Combat Engineering Equipment - Dry Support Bridges Acquisition Project, which is a Horizon 2 phase project under the RAFPMP and awarded to UK's WFEL as part of G2G deal between the Philippines DND and UK MOD.
Saudi Arabia
In November 2016 it was announced that an undisclosed international customer had awarded Rheinmetall a €134 million contract for 110 HX81 with semi-trailers for delivery between January 2018 and February 2019, with additional orders envisaged. Specific configuration details of the combination were not released, but the contract value included comprehensive service and logistical support for a period of five years. During 2023 it became known that the vast majority of these trucks and trailers (around 90) were not delivered due to German export licence issues. They were later supplied to Ukraine.
Singapore
Singapore operates around 60 44M 8×8 with recovery hampers provided by Miller. Further trucks in for use in a system carrier role are understood to be on order as of 2024.
Slovakia
From May 2011 the Slovak Army received 20 HX77 8×8 configured as container carriers.
Slovenia
In exchange for sending 28 Slovenian M55S tanks (upgraded T-55 tanks) to Ukraine, Germany transferred over 40 44M trucks in WLS configuration to Slovenia in December 2022. These were from German Army stocks.
In 2025, Slovenia ordered 28 armoured HX2 8×8 tactical trucks in several configurations.
Sweden
In May 2014 Sweden placed an initial order with RMMV for trucks. The initial order was for 215 trucks, of which 62 were HX2, the bulk of these 44M 8×8. Deliveries commenced during 2017. In 2018 another 40 HX2 were ordered as a system carrier for the Patriot air defense system, and in 2019 an initial 24 (now 48) HX2 were ordered as a carrier for the ammunition handling system belonging to the Archer artillery system. Swedish orders (excluding Archer) are under a framework agreement that includes Norway, and the original intention of this agreement was to buy up to 2,000 military logistics vehicles before 2026. By November 2024 around 350 HX range trucks are thought to have been ordered by Sweden and Norway combined.
Thailand
Small quantity, use unknown but thought to be system carrier application, and possibly radar.
Turkey
Supplied via Aselsan; small quantity, use unknown but thought to be system carrier application.
Ukraine
Ukraine has received a selection of HX trucks, the total number of which is thought to be around 350. These have included surplus HX60 from UK stocks, and used 40M from Austria (total around 200), around 75 mainly 44M from German stocks in WLS and system carrier configurations, and around 90 HX81 HETs with semi-trailers that were originally destined for Saudi Arabia and delivered by July 2024.
United Arab Emirates
Between 2011-2014 it is understood that 32 (4 + 28) HX81 with 28 Crossmobil five-axle full-width semi-trailers were delivered to the UAE. Most of the HX81 have an extended version of the standard RMMV modular military cab, and the rear two drive axles have the standard 16.00 R 20 tyres replaced with wider 24 R 21 tyres as fitted to the semi-trailer.
United Kingdom
In October 2004 the UK Defence Procurement Agency (DPA) selected the MAN ERF UK Ltd proposal for the UK armed forces' Support Vehicle requirement. A contract award followed in March 2005. The base contract award covered 5,165 vehicles and 69 recovery trailers. The first vehicles entered service in June 2007. Support Vehicle contract deliveries to the UK Ministry of Defence totalled 7,415 + 69 trailers (7,484). This figure including a contract option, plus some delivery revisions and additional orders. The Support Vehicle contract called for two model ranges to be delivered to the MoD, SX and HX, with a >90% quantity bias towards HX models. In 2023, the UK confirmed a surplus of HX60 trucks, with some of these supplied to Ukraine. In 2023/2024, the UK received 500 44M from German Army stocks in WLS configuration.
United States
Small quantity supplied for OPFOR roles during training.
Vietnam
HX58 and HX77 variants are used to mount the Israeli-made SPYDER surface-to-air missile systems that is operated by the Vietnamese Air Force. From 2015 around five or six batteries are thought to have been acquired.

== See also ==
- MAN LX and FX ranges of tactical trucks - Predecessors of HX range
- MAN KAT1 - Predecessor of SX range
- MAN SX - Successor to KAT 1, originally complemented HX range
- RMMV Survivor R - Wheeled armoured vehicle offered by RMMV
- YAK - Wheeled armoured vehicle offered by RMMV
- Armoured Multi-Purpose Vehicle - Wheeled light armoured/multirole vehicle offered by RMMV in a JV with KMW
- Boxer - Wheeled armoured vehicle offered by RMMV in a JV with KMW
- Rheinmetall MAN Military Vehicles - JV of MAN and Rheinmetall for wheeled vehicles
- TPz (Transportpanzer) Fuchs - Wheeled armoured personnel carrier
- List of modern equipment of the German Army
