= AMPV =

AMPV may refer to:

- Armored Multi-Purpose Vehicle, US Army replacement for the M113 based on the Bradley Fighting Vehicle
- Armoured Multi-Purpose Vehicle, German military vehicle
- Avian metapneumovirus, a virus
