= MAN SX =

MAN/RMMV SX
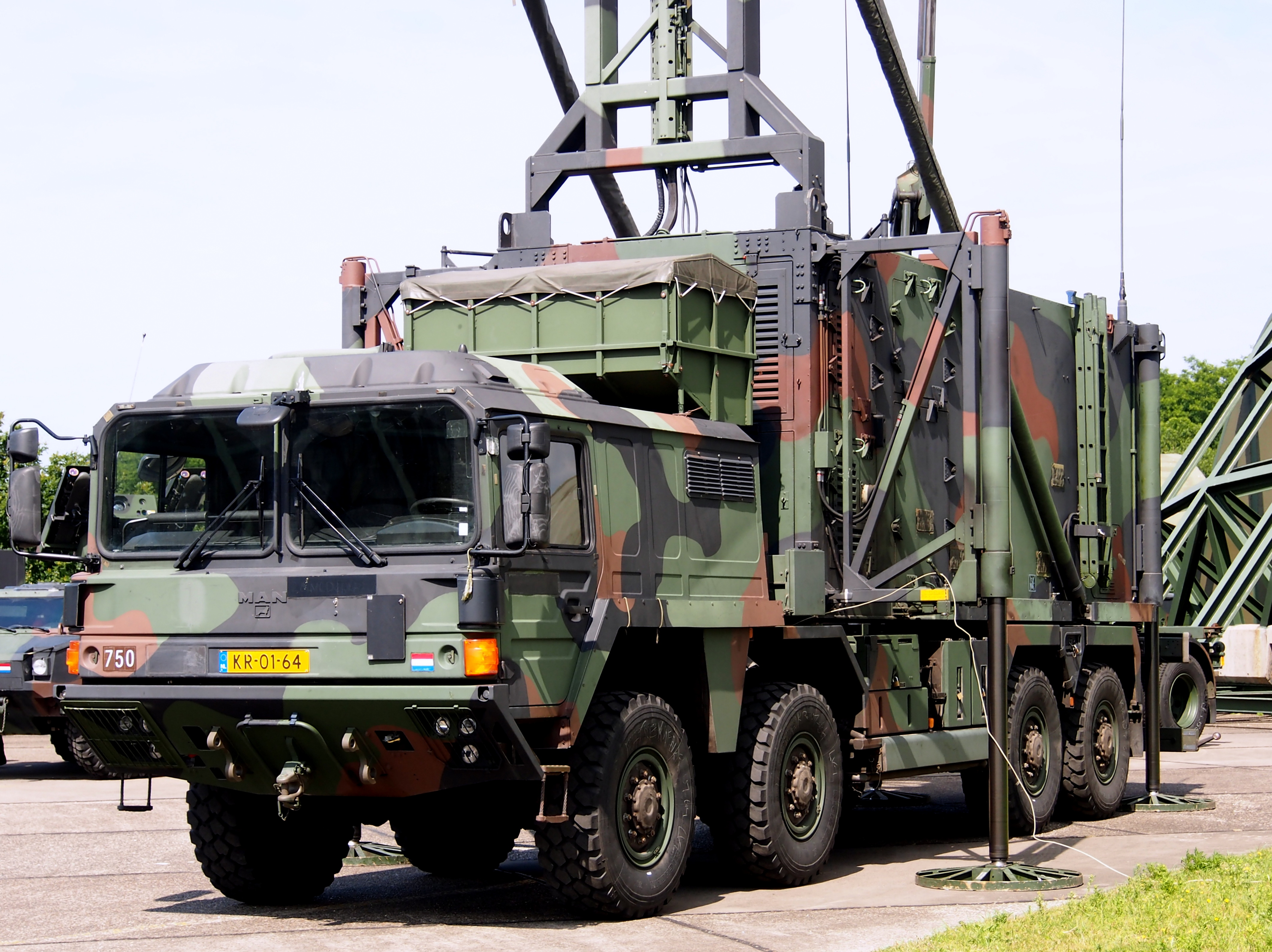
- Photographed at Gilze-Rijen Air Base, the Netherlands, a MAN SX 8×8
- Type: 8×8, 6×6, and 4×4 off-road trucks
- Place of origin: Germany

Service history
- Used by: Algeria, Austria (badged OAF), Denmark, Germany, Italy, Kuwait, Lithuania, Norway, Oman, Slovenia, Sweden, UAE and the UK. In some instances numbers were small.

Production history
- Manufacturer: MAN SE / RMMV

Specifications
- Engine: MAN diesel
- Suspension: coil spring

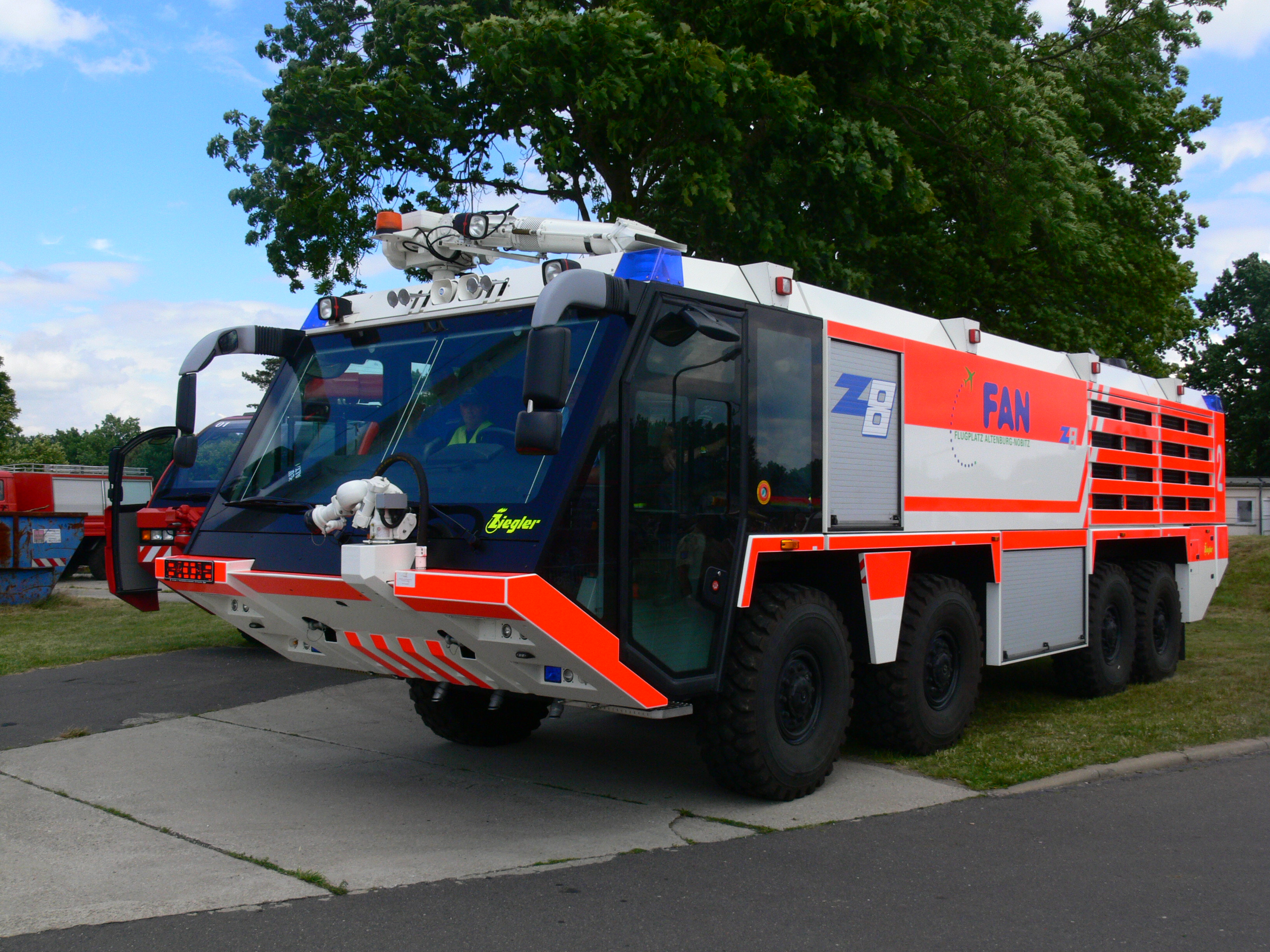
Ziegler fire engine based on the MAN SX

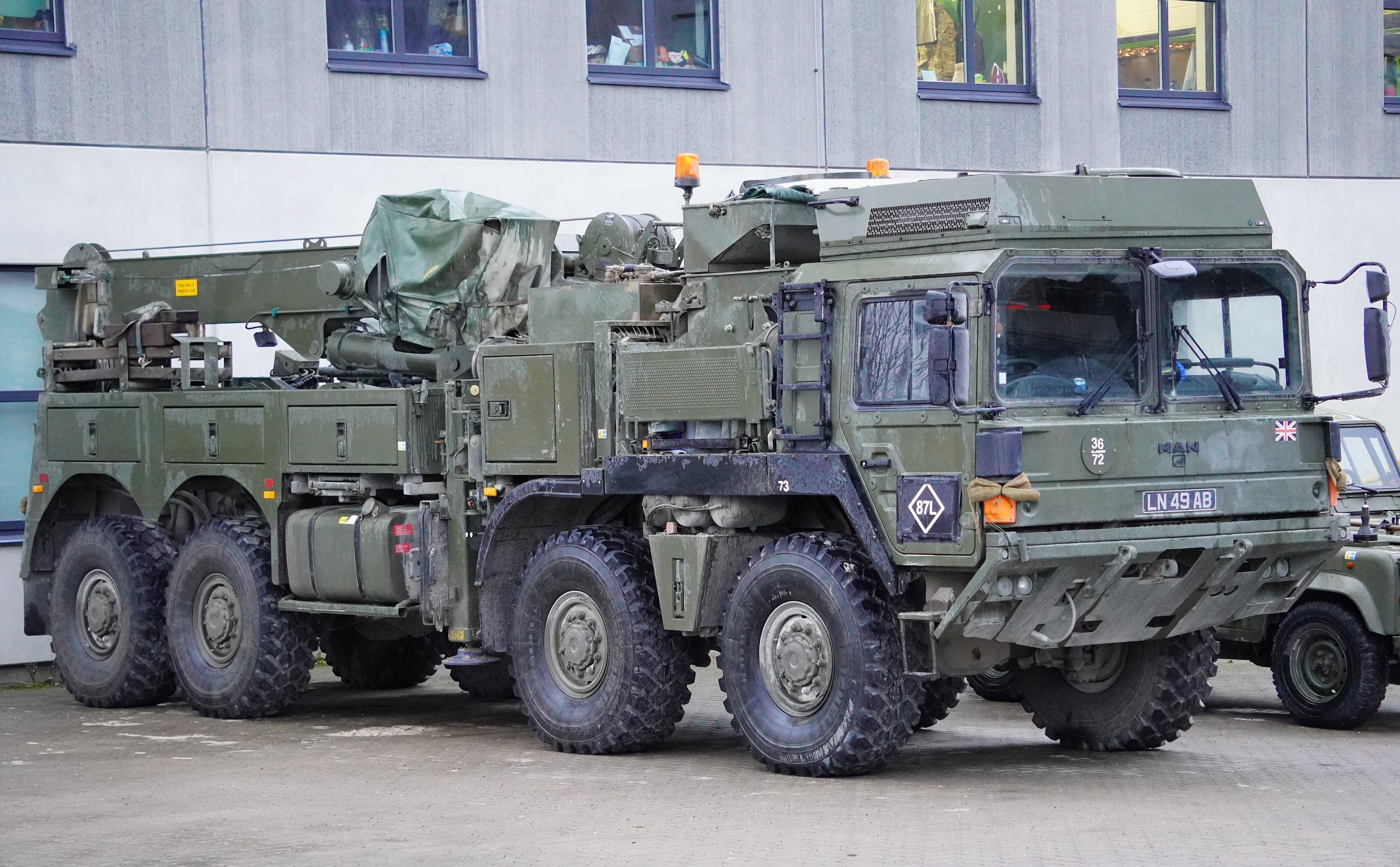
MAN Support Vehicle - Recovery (SVR) 8×8, based on the MAN SX, operated by the British Army.

The SX is a family of high-mobility off-road tactical trucks manufactured by Rheinmetall MAN Military Vehicles GmbH (RMMV). Production of the type had ended by early 2019. The SX range had its design origins in the MAN KAT1 range of trucks, and for brief periods was marketed as the SX90 or S2000 range of trucks. MAN (now RMMV) claimed it was the most mobile and reliable truck on earth.

For clarity, RMMV is a 49%/51% joint venture established in January 2010 between MAN Nutzfahrzeuge AG (now MAN Truck & Bus) and Rheinmetall AG.

There were 8×8, 6×6, and 4×4 variants, although during later production runs only 6×6 and 8×8 variants were produced. All SX trucks are air-transportable by C-130 Hercules in cargo configuration, with limited preparation in some instances. A 10×10 demonstrator was also built, with a 1000 hp engine, but this did not enter production.

The SX range shared a number of technologies (most visibly, the modular military-specific cab) with the HX, and also the earlier FX, LX and MX families.

The UK MoD ordered large numbers of SX and MAN HX trucks to replace fleets of Foden, Bedford, and DAF Trucks. 7285 had been ordered by April 2010. A 8×8 heavy recovery version has also been built; the UK MoD ordering 288.

An airport firefighting version was also made; firefighting equipment is supplied by Ziegler and Rosenbauer.

== See also ==
- MAN LX and FX ranges of tactical trucks
- Rheinmetall MAN Military Vehicles (RMMV) HX range of tactical trucks
- MAN KAT1 - Designation for original SX range trucks
- Rheinmetall MAN Military Vehicles Survivor R - Wheeled armoured MRAP-type vehicle offered by RMMV
- Armoured Multi-Purpose Vehicle (AMPV) - Wheeled light armoured/multi-role vehicle offered by RMMV in a JV with KMW
- Rheinmetall MAN Military Vehicles YAK - Wheeled armoured vehicle offered by RMMV
- Boxer - Wheeled armoured vehicle offered by RMMV in a JV with KMW
- Rheinmetall MAN Military Vehicles - JV of MAN and Rheinmetall for wheeled vehicles
- List of modern equipment of the German Army

== Bibliography ==
- Schulze, Carl (2021). MAN Support Vehicles: Die modernsten Lastkraftwagen der British Army / The most modern Trucks of the British Army. British Special No. 9025 (in English and German). Erlangen, Germany: Tankograd Publishing. OCLC 960105142.
