= MAN LX and FX ranges of tactical trucks =

Military truck family

The LX and FX are ranges of purpose-designed tactical military trucks manufactured by what is now Rheinmetall MAN Military Vehicles (RMMV). They were replaced in production by the HX range. There was also an MX range, but this was only produced in very small numbers for the German Navy.

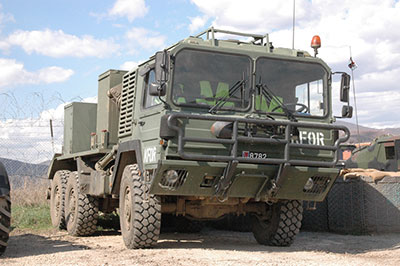
Luxembourg Army LX range (6x6) truck in recovery configuration in Kosovo with KFOR

== Development ==
Production of the LX range ran from 1988 until 2004. Production of the FX range ran from 1990 until around 2005. Both ranges were replaced by the HX range.

LX, FX and HX ranges were available/remain available alongside the SX range of high mobility tactical trucks.

LX and FX trucks were manufactured by MAN. HX trucks are manufactured by RMMV. In 2009 Germany’s MAN Nutzfahrzeuge AG (now MAN Truck & Bus) and Rheinmetall AG announced their respective intentions to form a joint wheeled military vehicles company, this becoming a reality in January 2010. RMMV was essentially the merger of Rheinmetall's wheeled military vehicle activities with the military truck business of MAN. The merger brought together MAN's automotive expertise in volume commercial vehicle manufacture with Rheinmetall's technological know-how in the military land sector/systems field. From 2019 the joint venture has focused on logistic and tactical trucks only.

== LX range ==
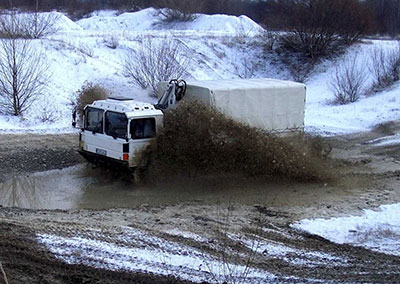
LX range 6x6 truck demonstrating the speed advantage off-road of an individually sprung rear axle pair

Introduced in 1988, the LX range was designed to be relatively light weight, C-130 Hercules transportable, and possess a good level of cross country mobility.

LX range were based on MAN's then current M2000 medium weight commercial truck chassis, these modified and militarized as required. Two- and three-axle chassis were available, these having maximum carrying capacities including body/superstructure of 3.5- to 10-tonnes.

On three axle chassis the rear axle pair are not sprung by the more conventional shared inverted leaf spring, but are sprung individually by leaf springs. According to the manufacturer this is a more complex option but it does improve off-road mobility.

MAN's modular military cab was fitted to all LX models. To keep the overall height as low as possible, MAN's small block diesel engines were fitted. Engines were located in the standard place, but the cooling pack was situated behind the cab.

The LX range was replaced in production from 2004 by the MAN TG-based HX range. The LX range was occasionally presented as LX 2000.

== FX range ==
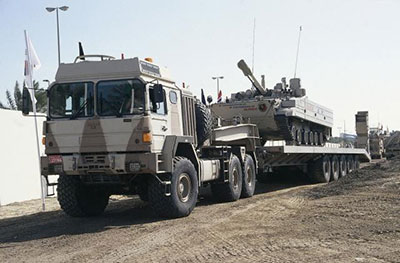
MAN's 40.633 FX range DFAETX tank transporter is in service with UAE Armed Forces. A similar vehicle (with a different trailer) is in service with Greece badged Steyr

Introduced in 1990, the FX range complemented the lighter LX range and was designed for heavier gross vehicle and gross combination weights.

The FX range were initially based on chassis from MAN's F90 heavy commercial range, production of which ran from 1986 to 1992. From 1992 onwards, FX range trucks were based on the F2000 heavy commercial range.

All FX range trucks were fitted with MAN's modular military cab and most had a conventionally positioned engine. The cooling pack, and for certain applications (heavy tractor trucks for example) the engine, was located behind the cab.

The MAN FX range of tactical trucks was replaced in production from 2005 by the MAN TG-based HX range.

The FX range was occasionally presented as FX 2000.

== MX range ==
The MX range was based on F90 commercial chassis and was not produced in quantity, the only known production batch delivered to the German Navy in 4×2 cargo truck configuration during 1993–1994. The only two MX range trucks known to have been developed had the internal MAN codes of X53 and X56. German Navy trucks were X53, these based on the M05 F90 commercial chassis and fitted with leaf suspension all-round and a large purpose-designed steel front bumper/radiator guard. Motive power is provided by a 230 hp engine, and payload is 14,000 kg. The X56, of which a single prototype was built, featured air-suspension on the rear axle.

== Operators ==
=== LX range ===
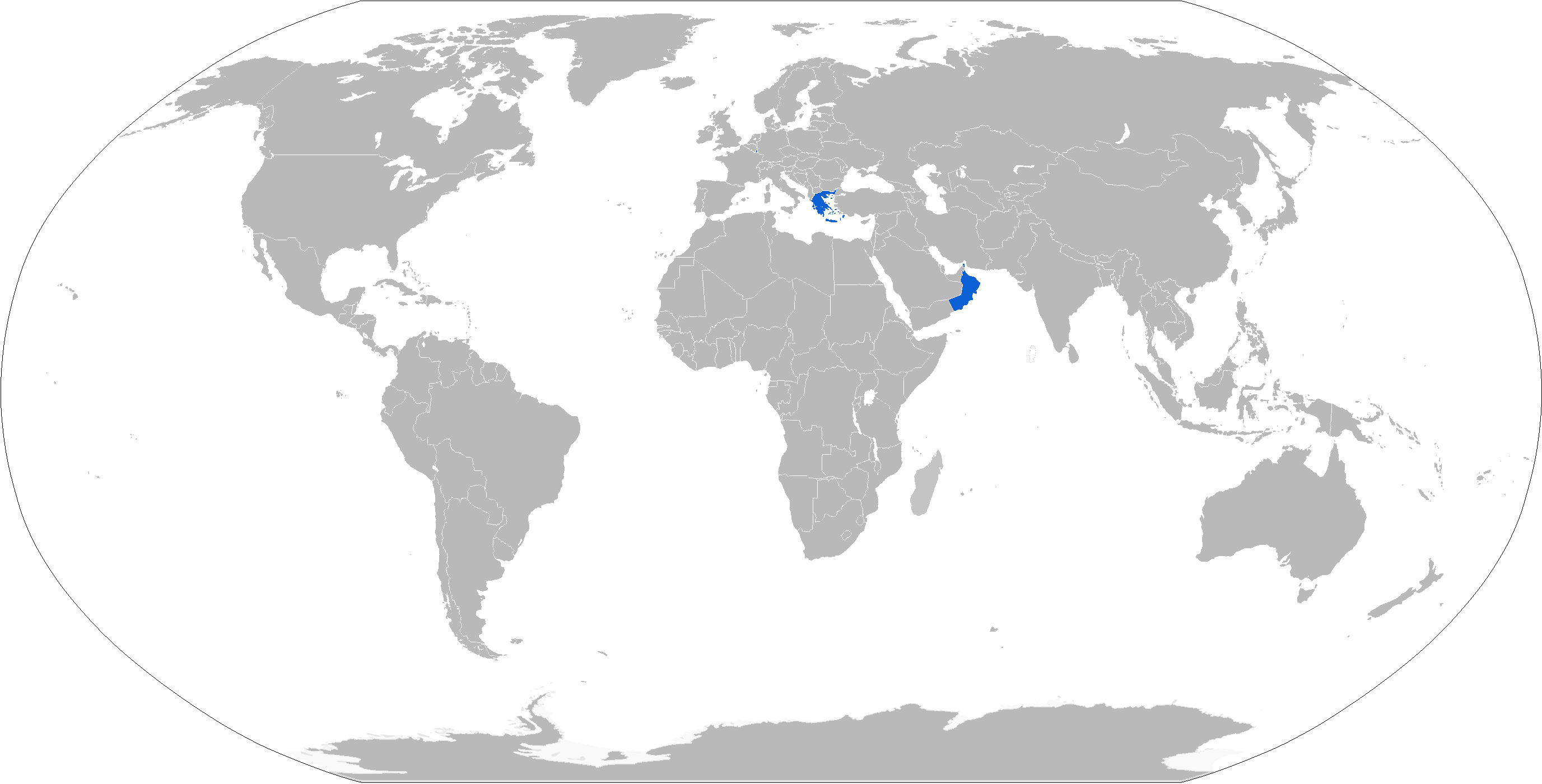
Map with military MAN LX operators in blue

- Greece (badged Steyr)
- Luxembourg (inc. recovery)
- Oman (est. 450 from 1992)

=== FX range ===
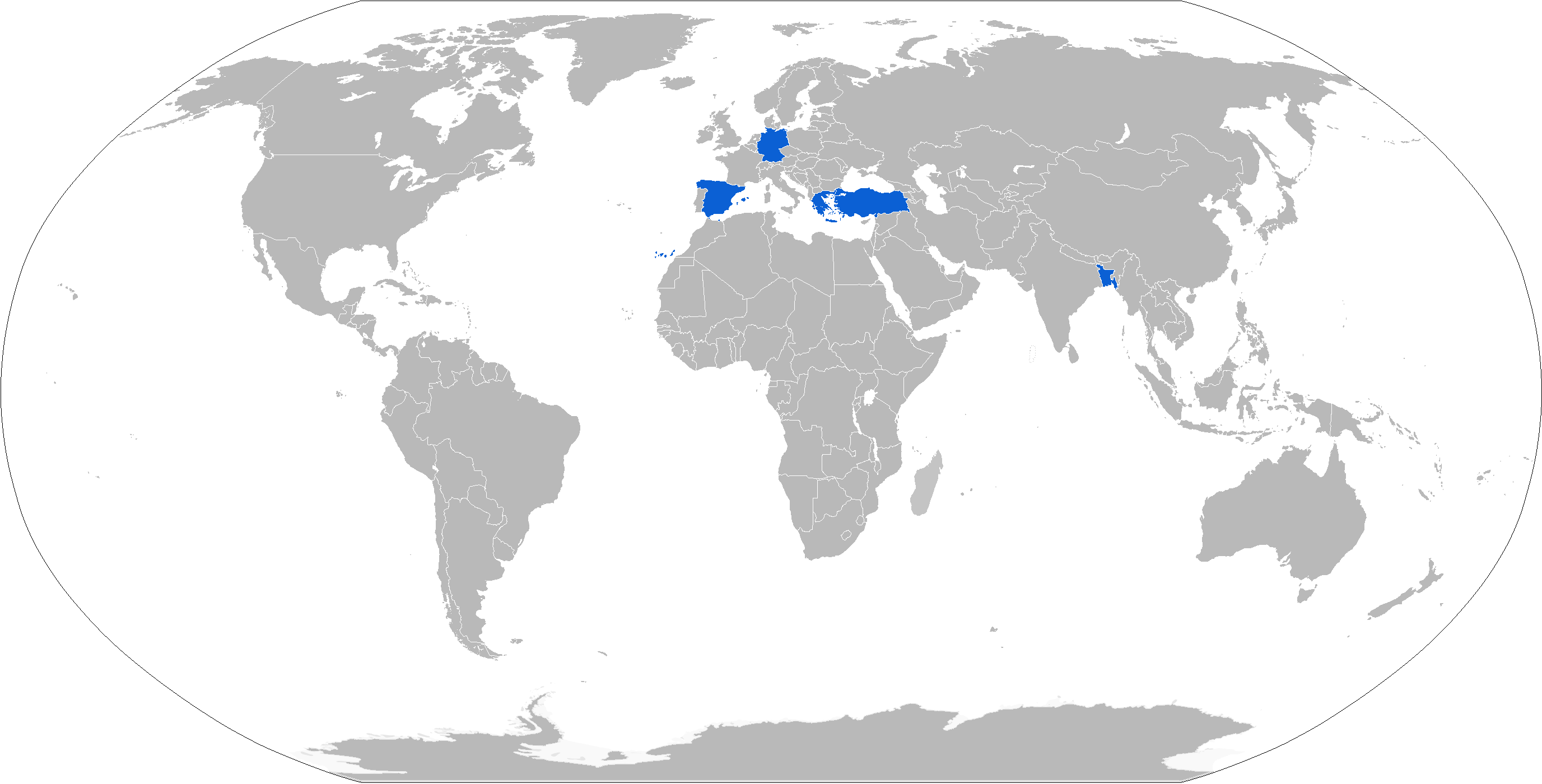
Map with military MAN FX operators in blue

- Germany (inc. 4x4 tractor units)
- Greece (badged Steyr; including HETs)
- Spain (Air Force, FCR)
- Bangladesh (Bangladesh Army)
- Turkey (Vehicles produced in Turkey were manufactured by MAN Türkiye A.S.)

== See also ==
- Rheinmetall MAN Military Vehicles (RMMV) HX range of tactical trucks - Successor of the FX and LX ranges
- MAN KAT1 - Predecessor of SX range, currently offered to complement HX range
- MAN SX - Successor to KAT1, currently complements HX range
- RMMV Survivor R - Wheeled armoured vehicle offered by RMMV
- Rheinmetall YAK - Wheeled armoured vehicle offered by RMMV
- Boxer - Wheeled armoured vehicle offered by RMMV in a JV with KMW
- Rheinmetall MAN Military Vehicles - JV of MAN and Rheinmetall for wheeled vehicles
- List of modern equipment of the German Army
