= Armoured Multi-Purpose Vehicle =

German light armoured vehicle

Armoured Multi-Purpose Vehicle (AMPV)
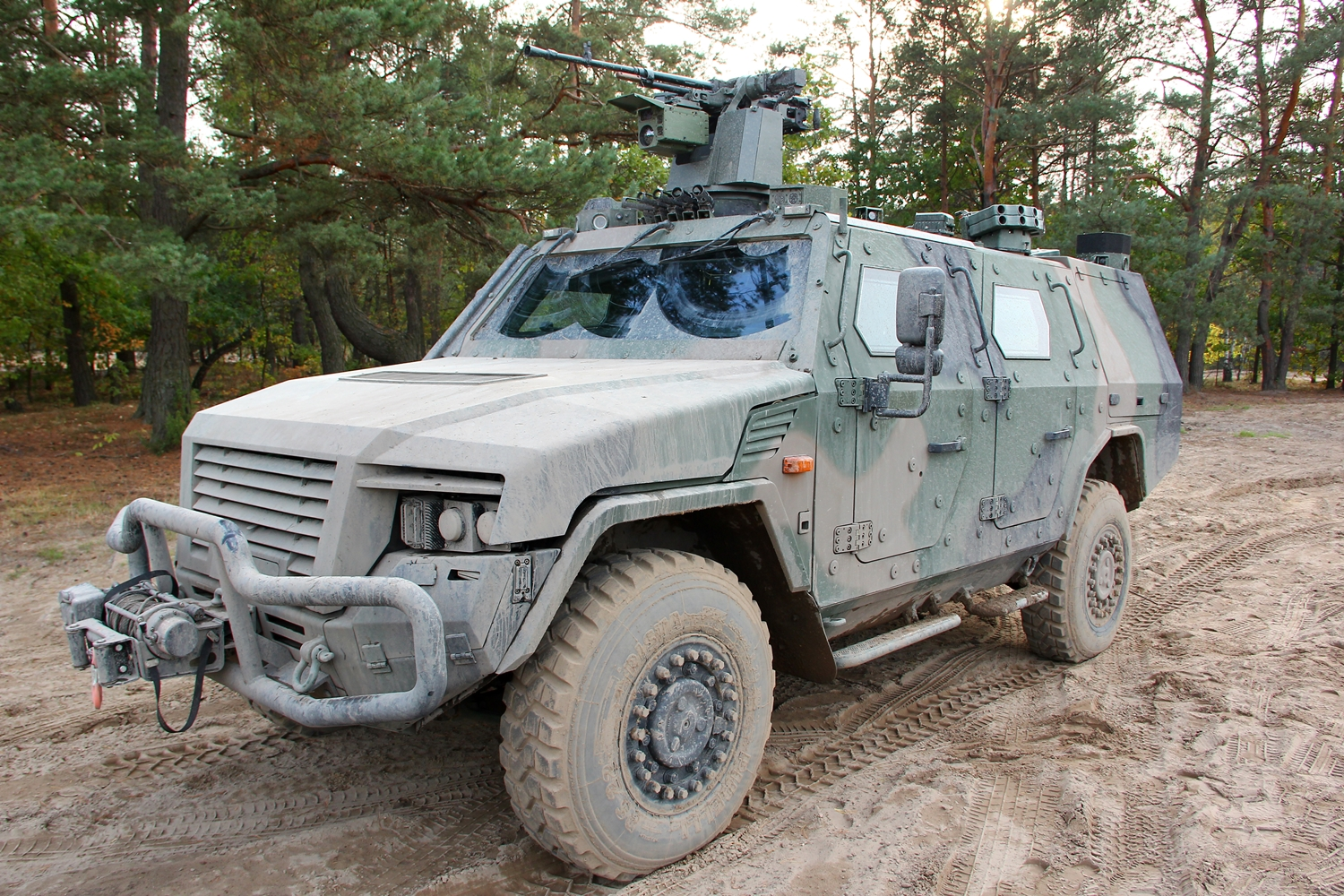
- AMPV optimised for special forces role; the rear stowage compartment has been enlarged to meet specific Polish special forces requirements
- Type: Light armoured vehicle
- Place of origin: Germany

Service history
- Used by: German Army (evaluated)

Production history
- Designer: RMMV, KMW & Porsche
- Designed: 2007
- Manufacturer: RMMV or KMW
- Variants: Various role-specific variants available in special forces, command/control, reconnaissance and internal security

Specifications
- Mass: 10,000 kg (GVWR; certified protection levels); 7800 kg (unladen)
- Length: 5.66 m
- Width: 2.3 m (without mirrors)
- Height: 2.18 m (without armament)
- Crew: Driver + up to 4 (configuration dependent)
- Armor: Steel and AMAP composite appliqué. Classified, but scalable and upgradeable to suit prevailing threat level
- Engine: Steyr M16SCI, 3.2-litre, 6-cylinder inline monoblock water-cooled EURO 3 compliant 4-stroke diesel developing 272 hp @ 4000 rpm and 610 Nm torque @ 1800 rpm
- Payload capacity: 2200 kg (@ 10,000 kg GVWR and maximum certified protection level)
- Transmission: ZF 6HP28 (automatic) with 6 forward and 1 reverse gears; 2-speed transfer case
- Suspension: Independent suspension with double wishbones, dual coil-over shock absorbers per wheel station, hydraulic dampers
- Operational range: 435 mi (700 km) loaded
- Maximum speed: 68 mph (109 km/h)
- Steering system: power-assisted (15 m turning circle)

The Armoured Multi Purpose Vehicle (AMPV) is a light armoured 4×4 vehicle that has been developed as a joint venture between Germany's Rheinmetall MAN Military Vehicles (RMMV) and Krauss-Maffei Wegmann (KMW). It was developed for the German Army's Protected Command and Function (GFF) Group 2 requirement.

The overall design of the AMPV has moved forward from the Cold War thinking of previous generation wheeled armoured vehicles, and throughout it has been optimised for current asymmetric conflict operations. According to the manufacturer, right from the outset, purely military requirements dictated AMPV's design. In the process, the development team took systematic account of experience gained during the ISAF mission in Afghanistan and other operations worldwide. As a result, the AMPV is now the best-protected vehicle in its class anywhere.

== History ==
Development of the AMPV began in 2007, and a full-scale mockup was shown for the first time at Eurosatory 2008. The first fully functional prototype was shown for the first time in 2009.

The German Army purchased the AMPV for extensive trials, these completed late in 2011.

The AMPV was conceived as a family of vehicles that would meet a wide range of user requirements, and have gross vehicle weight ratings (GVWR) of between 5.3-tonnes (Type 1a & 1b) and 9.2-tonnes (Type 2a & 2b). Since conception, requirements have evolved and only Type 2 variants have been built, these now having a maximum permissible GVWR of 10.1-tonnes.

The AMPV has been demonstrated overseas and during 2010 an example underwent a series of high altitude trials in Chile. These included 2800 km at heights up to 4800 m above sea level. By 2015 the AMPV had completed approaching 30,000 test km in all conditions.

An AMPV optimised for special forces use was demonstrated in Poland during September 2015, this targeted at Poland's Pegaz project for special forces vehicles. This example featured a remotely operated weapon station made by Polish defence contractor Tarnow, armed with a heavy machine gun.

== Description ==
The AMPV was designed by RMMV and KMW, with body styling by Porsche Design Studio. Unlike many vehicles of similar size/capacity, the AMPV is not based on a commercial chassis, but has been designed and built specifically to meet military requirements.

The design of the AMPV is based around a central armoured crew cell/citadel, this having a multi-layered floor for enhanced mine blast protection. The self-supporting armoured steel citadel accepts add-on passive composite armour modules which can be changed as new armour technology evolves or the threat level changes. Crew survivability is enhanced by the installation of de-coupled seats. During trials, instrumented dummy crew members survived the blast from a 100 kg improvised explosive device (IED) that was exploded five metres from the AMPV citadel. AMPV also features built-in impact protection.

The AMPV also features air-conditioning and a full NBC filtration and over-pressure system.

The front power pack and rear cargo area are not protected and mount to sub-frames, the AMPV not having a conventional chassis. The rear cargo area can be configured to suit user requirements and features 2220 litres of usable stowage space. AMPV can tow a trailer of up to 3500 kg in weight.

Motive power is provided by a Steyr Motors M16 SCI diesel engine that has the ability to operate for extended periods on high sulphur, low quality and military-specific fuels such as F34/JP-8. Twin 150A alternators provide electrical power for engine and associated systems, radios/communications equipment, and ancillaries such a remote weapon station.

The optional remote weapon station can be fitted with a machine gun (up to 12.7 mm) or a 40 mm automatic grenade launcher. A protected ringmount with similar armament options can also be fitted. If necessary, the protection level can be enhanced still further by integrating additional assemblies. These include Rheinmetall's Acoustic Sniper Localisation System (ASLS) and Situational Awareness System (SAS), assuring 360° monitoring of the vehicle's surroundings. Rheinmetall's Rapid Obscurant System (ROSY) system for generating a smoke screen is an option. Unlike conventional smoke/obscurant systems, ROSY creates an instantaneous, extensive, multispectral interruption of the line of sight, including a dynamic wall of smoke/obscurant that provides moving objects with sustained protection and concealment. The under-development Active Protective System (APS) will be a further option.

Gearbox is a fully automatic ZF unit, this coupled to a two-speed transfer case. The planetary hub-reduction drive axles have disc brakes and feature a central tire inflation system (CTIS) and anti-lock brakes (ABS). Tyres are 385/80R 20, wheels featuring runflat inserts as standard.

Suspension is fully independent, each wheel featuring twin coil-over shock-absorbers supplemented by hydraulic bump stops. Suspension stroke is up to +/-150mm.

The drivetrain features Steyr's Automatic Drivetrain Management (ADM). ADM automatically controls and monitors longitudinal and cross-axle differential locks, thereby reducing strain on the driver, with full drivetrain lock-up possible for maximum traction. RMMV literature states ADM offers advantages that include shorter driver training, longer service and maintenance intervals, prevention of damage by driver error or mistake, and longer tyre life.

Performance capabilities include the ability to climb >70% grade, traverse >40% sideslope, surmount a 400mm vertical step, cross a 750 mm wide ditch, and ford 850 mm of water without preparation. Ground clearance is 350 mm, and turning circle is 15 m. AMPV is able to operate at temperatures ranging from −46 °C to +55 °C.

Options can include a fire suppression system, a 360 degree camera system, a GPS system, and a front- or rear-mounting self-recovery winch.

The AMPV can be transported by standard rail cars, or in the air by C-130 Hercules aircraft or as an underslung load by Boeing CH-47 Chinook helicopter.

== Gallery ==
Armoured Multi-Purpose Vehicle (AMPV)

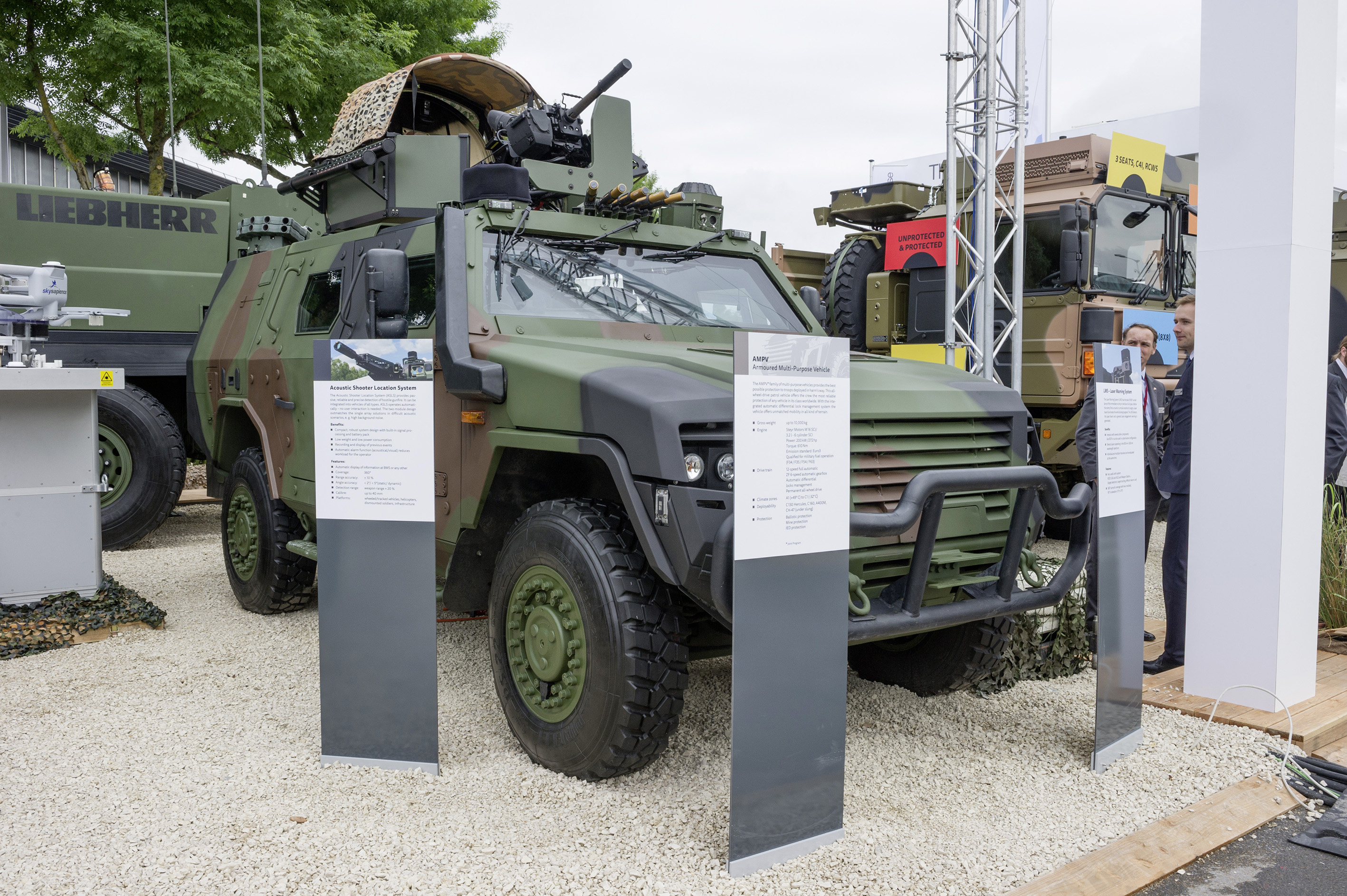
As displayed at Eurosatory 2016, AMPV fitted with a Vinghøg manned ringmount.

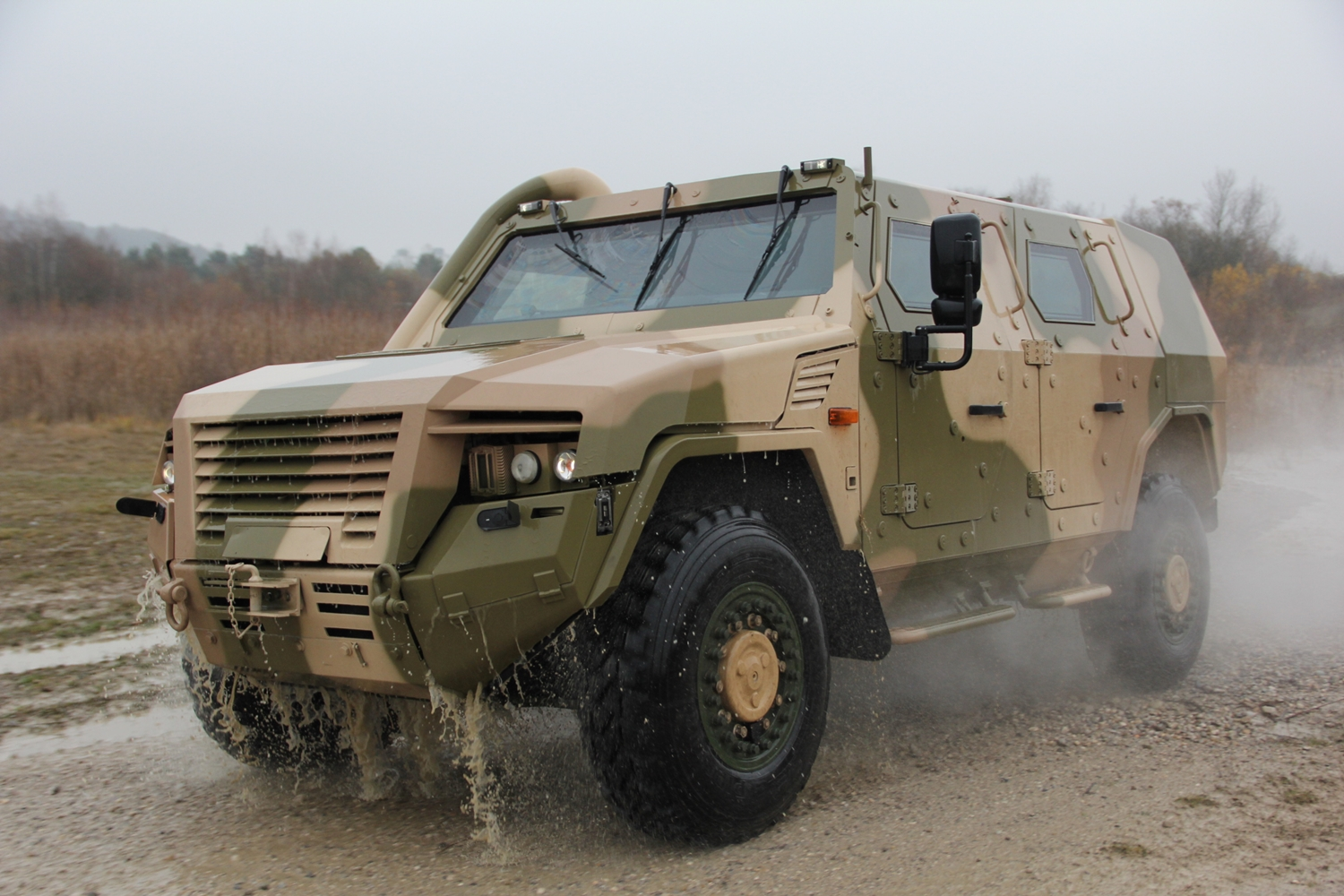
AMPV at speed during a mobility demonstration

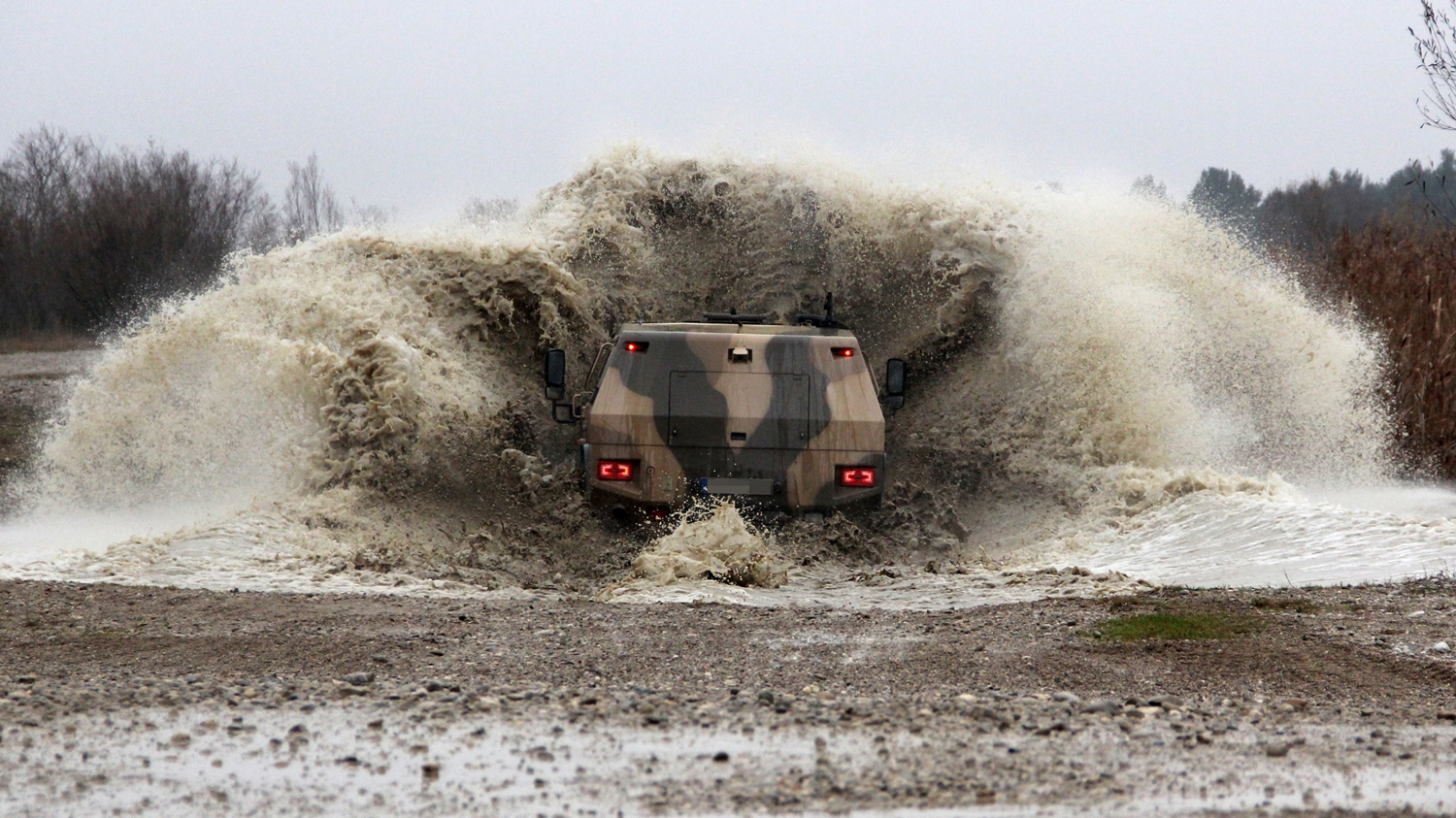
AMPV at speed during a mobility demonstration

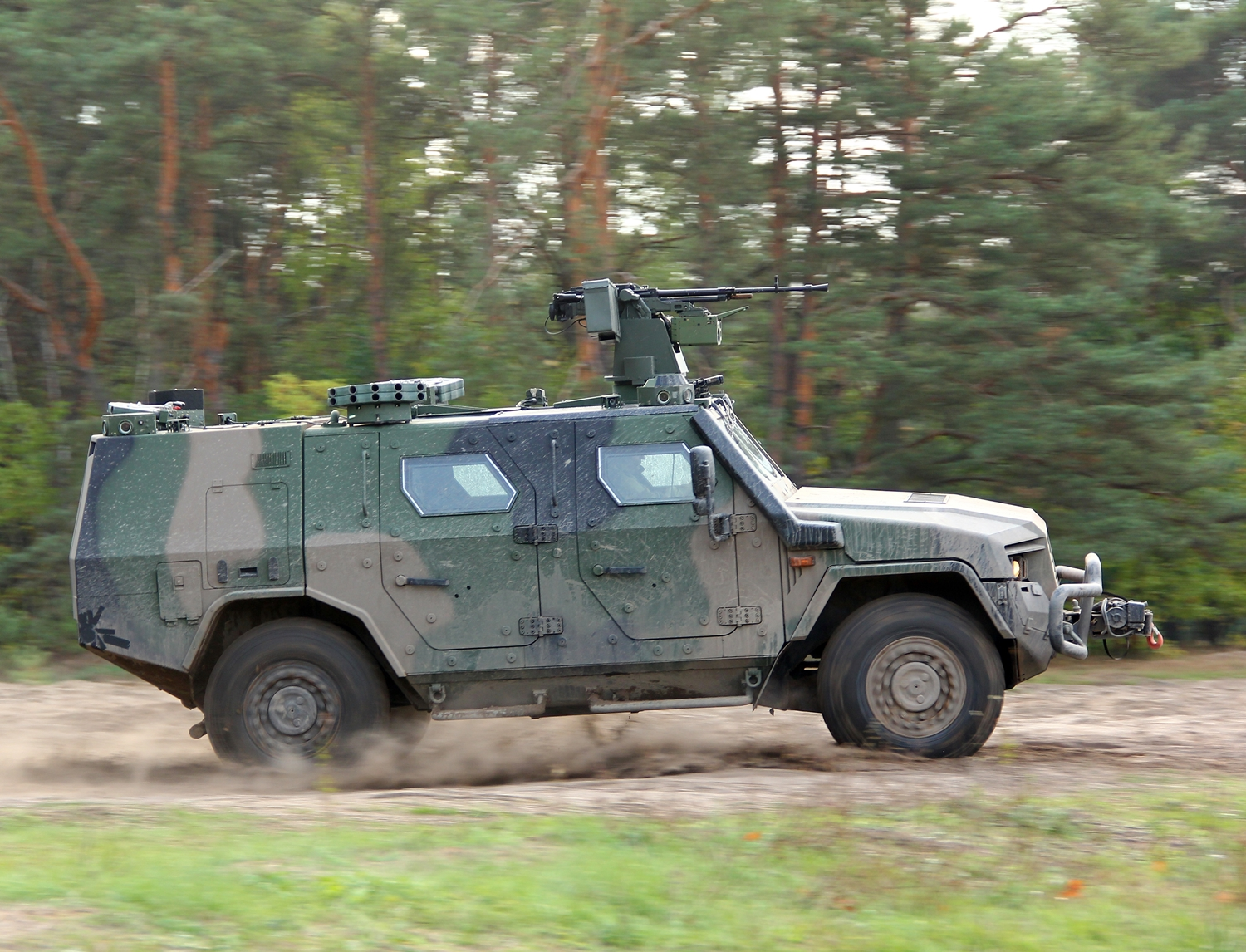
AMPV optimised for special forces role. The rear stowage compartment has been enlarged to meet specific Polish requirements

== See also ==
- RMMV Survivor R - Wheeled armoured vehicle offered by RMMV
- Rheinmetall YAK - Wheeled armoured vehicle offered by RMMV
- Boxer - Wheeled armoured vehicle offered by RMMV in a JV with KMW
- Rheinmetall MAN Military Vehicles - JV of MAN and Rheinmetall for wheeled vehicles
- MAN LX and FX ranges of tactical trucks - Tactical truck offered by RMMV
- MAN SX - Tactical truck offered by RMMV
- List of modern equipment of the German Army
- Mowag Eagle
- Oshkosh L-ATV
- Oshkosh M-ATV
- Dozor-B
- Pindad Komodo
- VEPR

== Bibliography ==
- AMPV Type 2A military brochure (KMW/RMMV) (2010)
- Jane's Armour & Artillery 2011/2012 ISBN 0710629605 Jane’s Land Warfare Platforms: Armoured Fighting Vehicles
- Jane's Armour & Artillery 2009/2010 ISBN 071062882X Jane’s Land Warfare Platforms: Armoured Fighting Vehicles
- AMPV 4x4 White Paper (KMW/RMMV) (Industry presentation 2015)
