= RMMV =

RMMV is an acronym for the following companies:

- Rheinmetall MAN Military Vehicles
- Royal Mail Motor Vessel
- Remote Multi Mission Vehicle, an unmanned, autonomous, semi-submersible system used by the US Navy to detect underwater mines.
- RPG Maker MV, the version of RPG Maker released in 2015.
