= RMMV TG MIL range of trucks =

Militarised commercial trucks

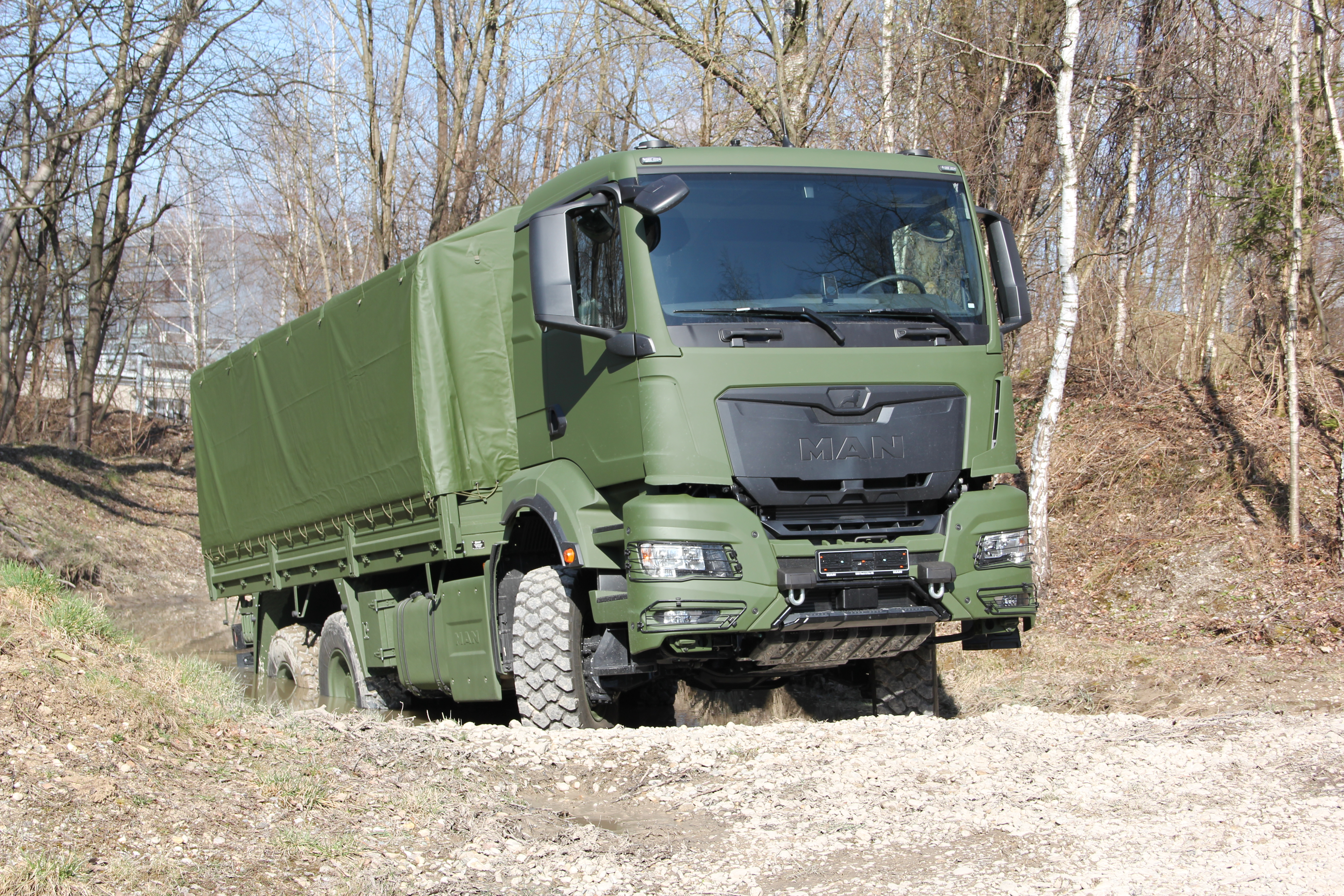
- A TG MIL range TGS (6x6)
- Type: Militarised commercial trucks.
- Place of origin: Austria (manufactured); Germany (design)

Service history
- In service: From 2006
- Used by: See Operators

Production history
- Designer: MAN Truck & Bus AG (truck); Rheinmetall MAN Military Vehicles (militarisation).
- Manufacturer: MAN Truck & Bus AG/Rheinmetall MAN Military Vehicles.
- Produced: 2005-present (2005-2010 by MAN; from 2010 by RMMV); numbers not disclosed.
- Variants: TGM MIL, TGA MIL and TGS MIL

Rheinmetall MAN Military Vehicles (RMMV) TG MIL (MIL – Militarized) range of trucks is based on MAN TG range commercial chassis that are militarised to suit individual customer requirements. The TG MIL was introduced from 2010 when RMMV was established in January of that year. RMMV was initially the merger of Rheinmetall's wheeled military vehicle activities with those of the military truck activities of the now MAN Truck & Bus AG, but from 2019 the joint venture focuses only on logistic vehicles. Prior to 2010 militarised TGM and TGA range trucks were products of the now MAN Truck & Bus AG.

== Description ==
Currently TG MIL are based on MAN TGM and TGS range trucks, but they have previously also been based on MAN TGA range trucks.

MAN's TG range of trucks is entirely conventional in design, based on a C-section ladder-frame chassis mounting an all-steel forward-control cab. The cab tilts forward for engine access and can be supplied in a variety of compact to crew-cab sizes. Ressenig of Austria has developed an armour solution for the TGS cab. A variety of body types can be fitted throughout the TG range, and in addition to the standard troop carrying/cargo-type body can include fuel or water tankers, shelter/box-type bodies, load handling systems or recovery hampers. Tractor trucks are also available.

Militarisation packages and modification are extensive and range from basic to near-tactical, and can include air-conditioning and/ or an auxiliary heater to manage extreme climate conditions, blackout lighting, NATO trailer coupling, rifle brackets in the cab, a roof hatch for observation and/or a machine gun mount, and steel bumpers with black out lights. To enhance mobility, single tyred axles (with differential locks) are available, these with a central tyre inflation system (CTIS) and runflat inserts if required. More extensive militarisation can include a fording capability of up to 750 mm, a self-recovery winch, and military-specific electrics/electronics and communication/ command equipment.

== Variants ==
=== TG MIL TGM ===
The TGM range became available commercially during 2006, replacing the earlier M2000 range. The first customer for militarised TGM models was the Austrian Army. Militarised TGM models have gross vehicle weights ranging from around 12- to 18-tonnes and are available with wheelbase options of 3.2, 3.6, 3.9, 4.2 and 4.5 m. Standard engine option for militarised TGM models is the six-cylinder D08 engine with up to 340 hp, this coupled to a nine-speed ZF manual all-synchromesh gearbox and MAN two-speed transfer case with selectable or permanent all-wheel drive. An Allison fully automatic transmission is optional. Axles are of the hub-reduction type, rear drive axles being single tyre specific if required. Examples with undriven front axles are also available. Suspension is by conventional leaf springs, complemented by shock absorbers and anti-roll bars as required. Standard tyre size is 14.00 R 20, with options including 395/85 R 20 or 525/65 R 20.5.

=== TG MIL TGS ===
The TGS range became commercially available 2007, supplementing and then replacing the earlier TGA range. Militarised TGS models became available in 2011 with Cyprus and an undisclosed Asian army being the launch customers. The TGA range became available commercially in 2000 to replace the earlier F2000 range. TGA-WW (WorldWide) models were introduced in 2002 for certain markets, these optimised for more demanding operating environments. TGA/TGA-WW remained available to military customers until 2011, final deliveries of militarised TGA/TGA-WW trucks including those made to the UAE in 2011.

Militarised TGS models have GVWs ranging from around 18- to 44-tonnes. Tractor trucks are available with GCWs of up to 250-tonnes. MAN turbocharged six-cylinder diesel engines are fitted across the range, with emissions options (dependent on territory) ranging from EURO 3 to EURO 5. Standard engine options for militarised TGS models are a MAN D20 rated at 440 hp or a MAN D26 rated at 480 hp. The D26 engine with rated at 540 hp is available for heavy equipment transporter applications, this including an extra cooling rack. A 16-speed ZF manual all-synchromesh gearbox is standard for the TGS range, this coupled to a MAN two-speed transfer box with selectable or permanent all-wheel drive. Axles are of the hub-reduction type, rear drive axles being single tyre specific if required. Examples with undriven front axles are also available. Suspension is by conventional leaf springs, complemented by shock-absorbers and anti-roll bars as required. Standard tyre size is 14.00 R 20, with options including 395/85 R 20, 525/65 R 20.5 and 12.00 R 24 twin tires for heavy equipment transporters.

Militarised TGS range trucks are assembled and militarised to individual customer requirements at RMMV's plant in Vienna, Austria.

=== Derivatives ===
==== RMMV Survivor R ====
The RMMV Survivor R is based on a MAN TGM 18.350 (4×4) chassis from MAN Austria, and modified by the Austrian Achtleiner Fachzeugbau, and is used by police forces as an armoured vehicle.

==== Sisu A2045 ====
Some mechanical parts of the MAN TG family are used on the Sisu A2045. The cabin and the chassis are designed and made by SISU, but all the mechanical parts are from RMMV.

==== TANAX AKTIS ====
This a Slovak truck used by the Slovak army based on the MAN TG-MIL truck family. It is used for transport, recovery, fire-fighting, command, field hospital.

== Gallery ==
RMMV TG MIL range of trucks

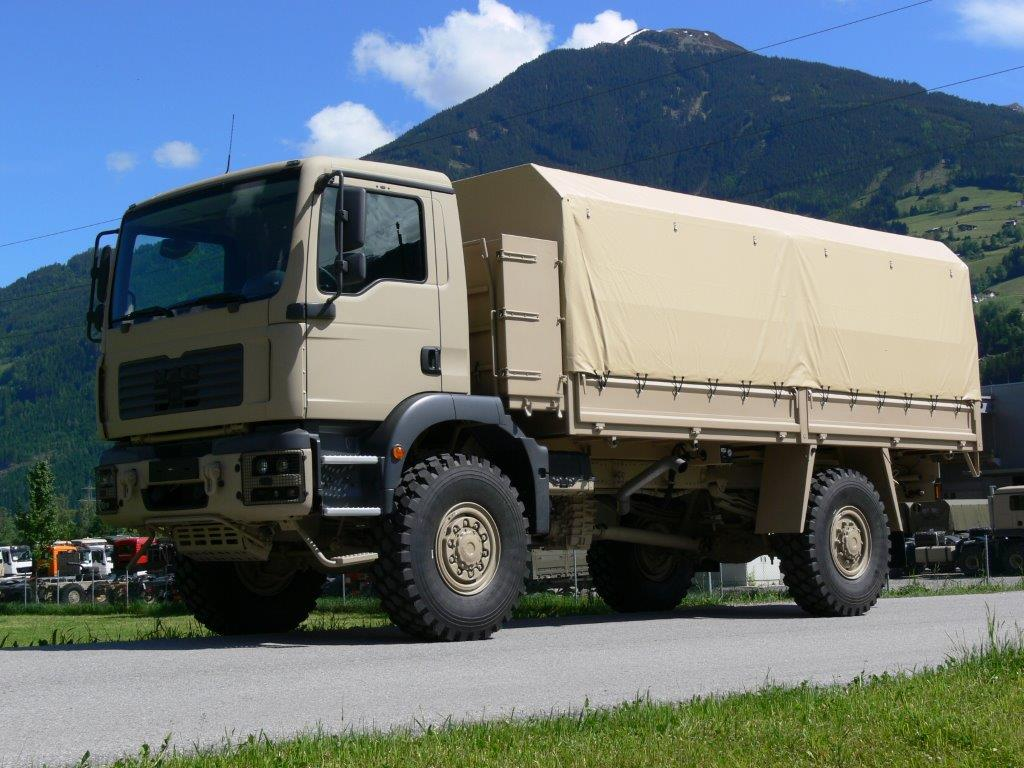
A TG MIL range TGM (4x4)

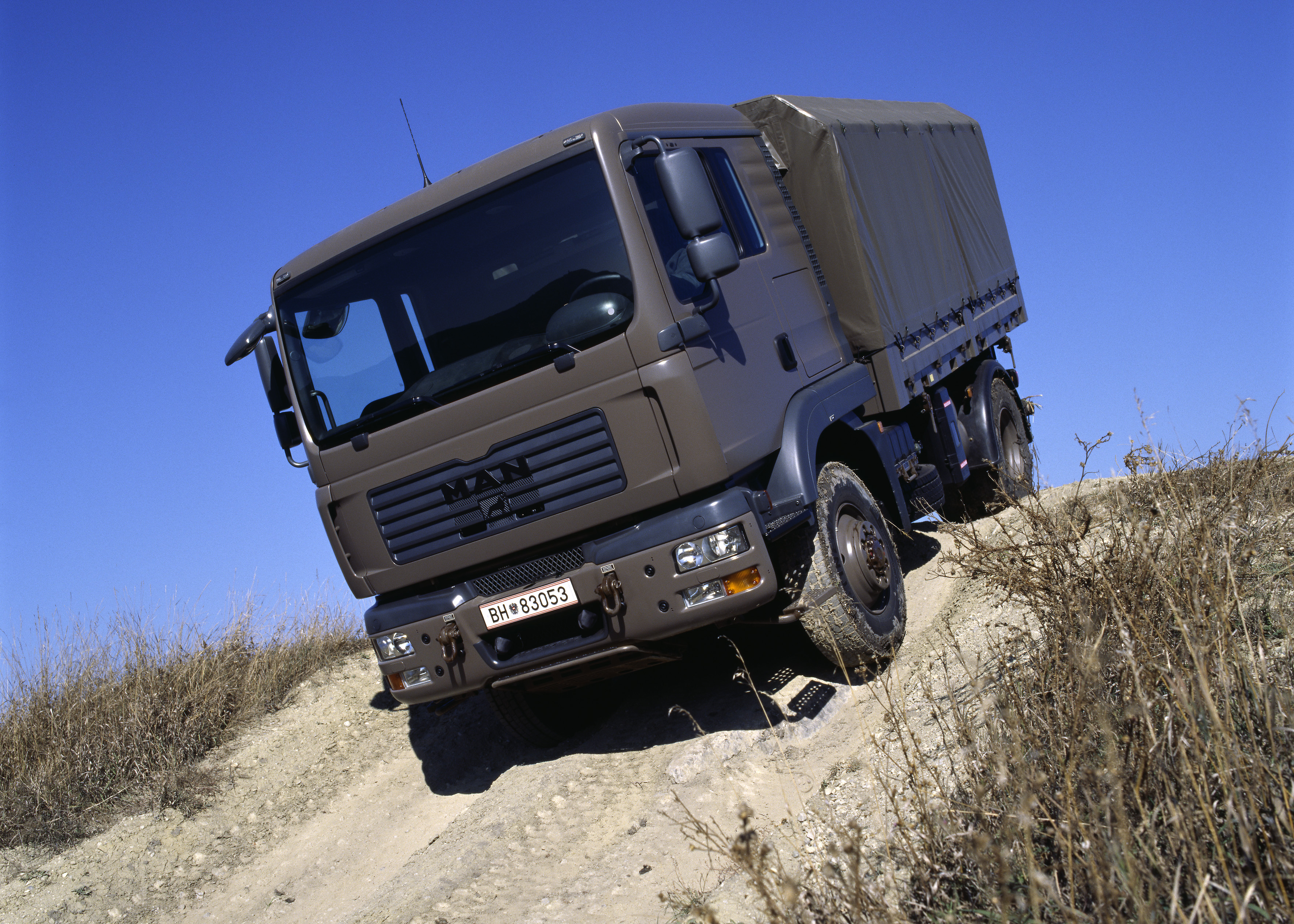
A TG MIL range TGM (4x4) of the Austrian Army

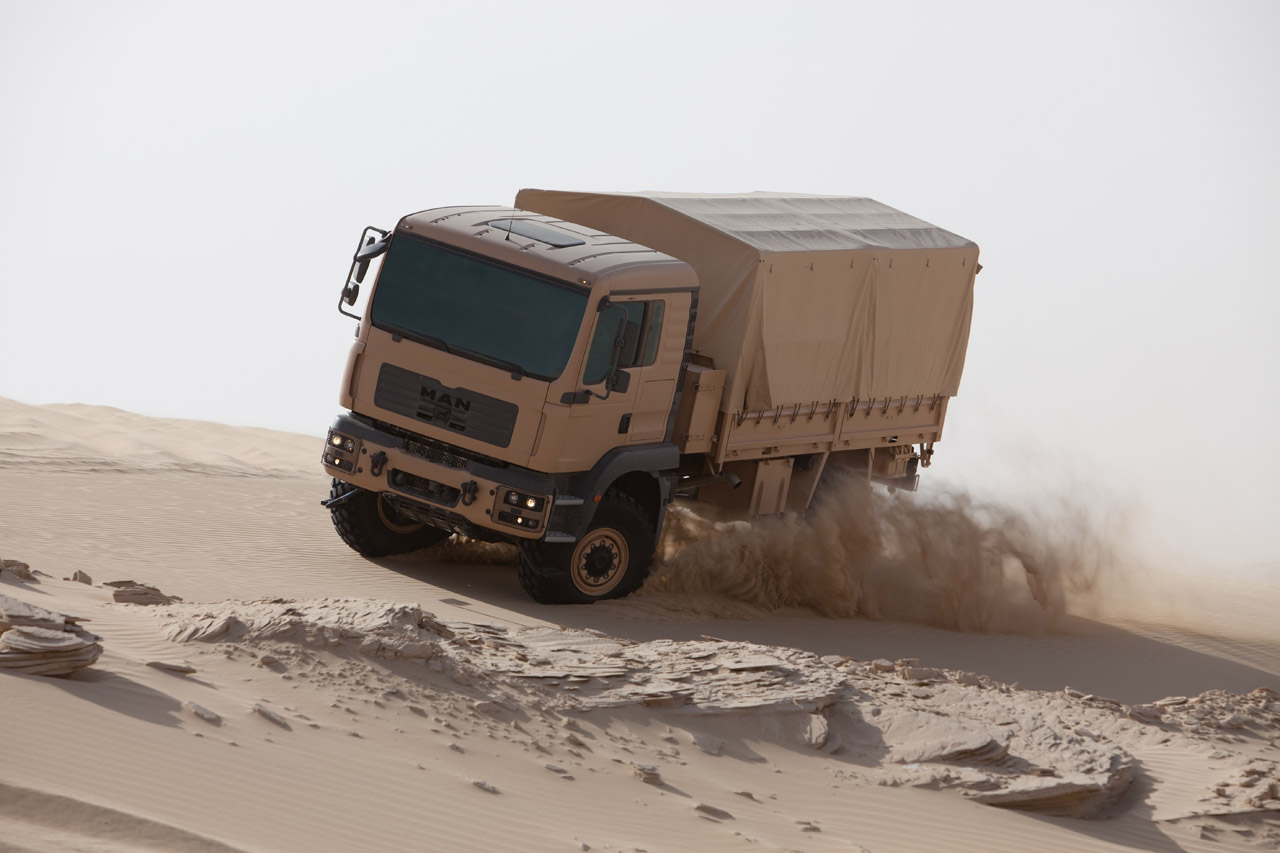
A TG MIL range TGM 18.280 (4x4); 18 denotes approx. GVW, 280 denotes approx. engine power - 280 hp

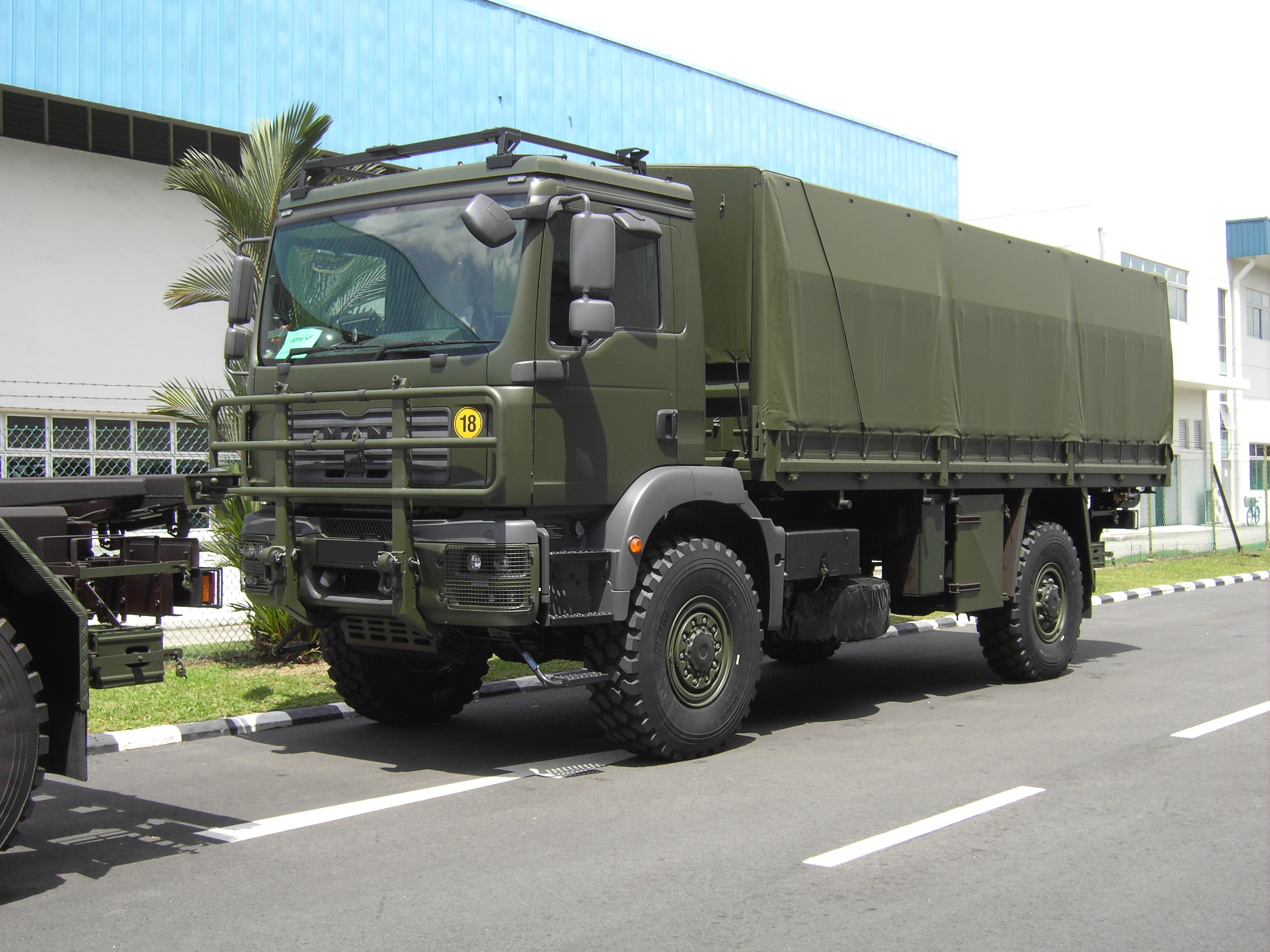
A TG MIL range TGM (4x4)

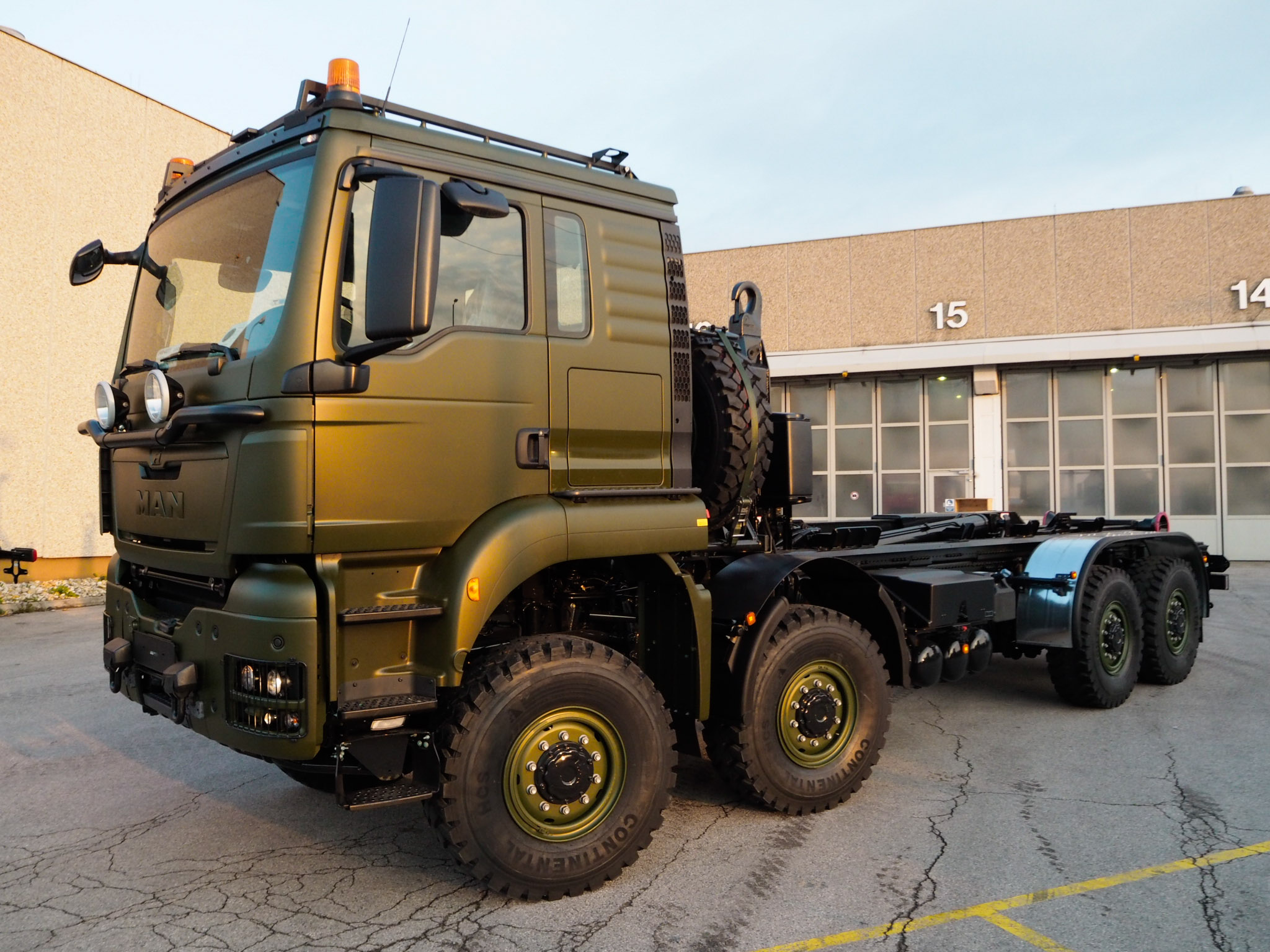
A TG MIL TGS (8x8), this example a Swedish Army trials vehicle

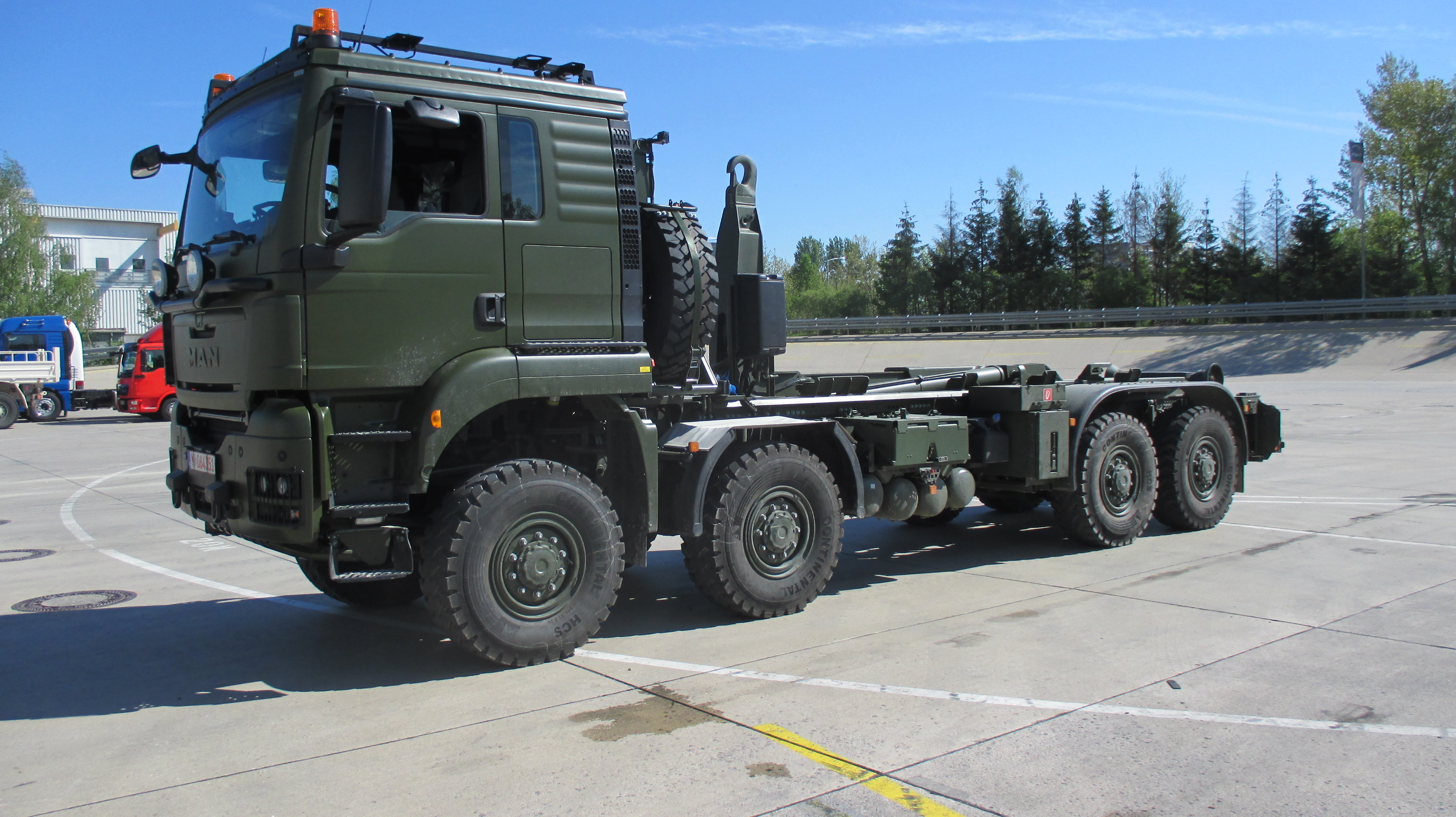
A TG MIL TGS (8x8), this example a Swedish Army trials vehicle

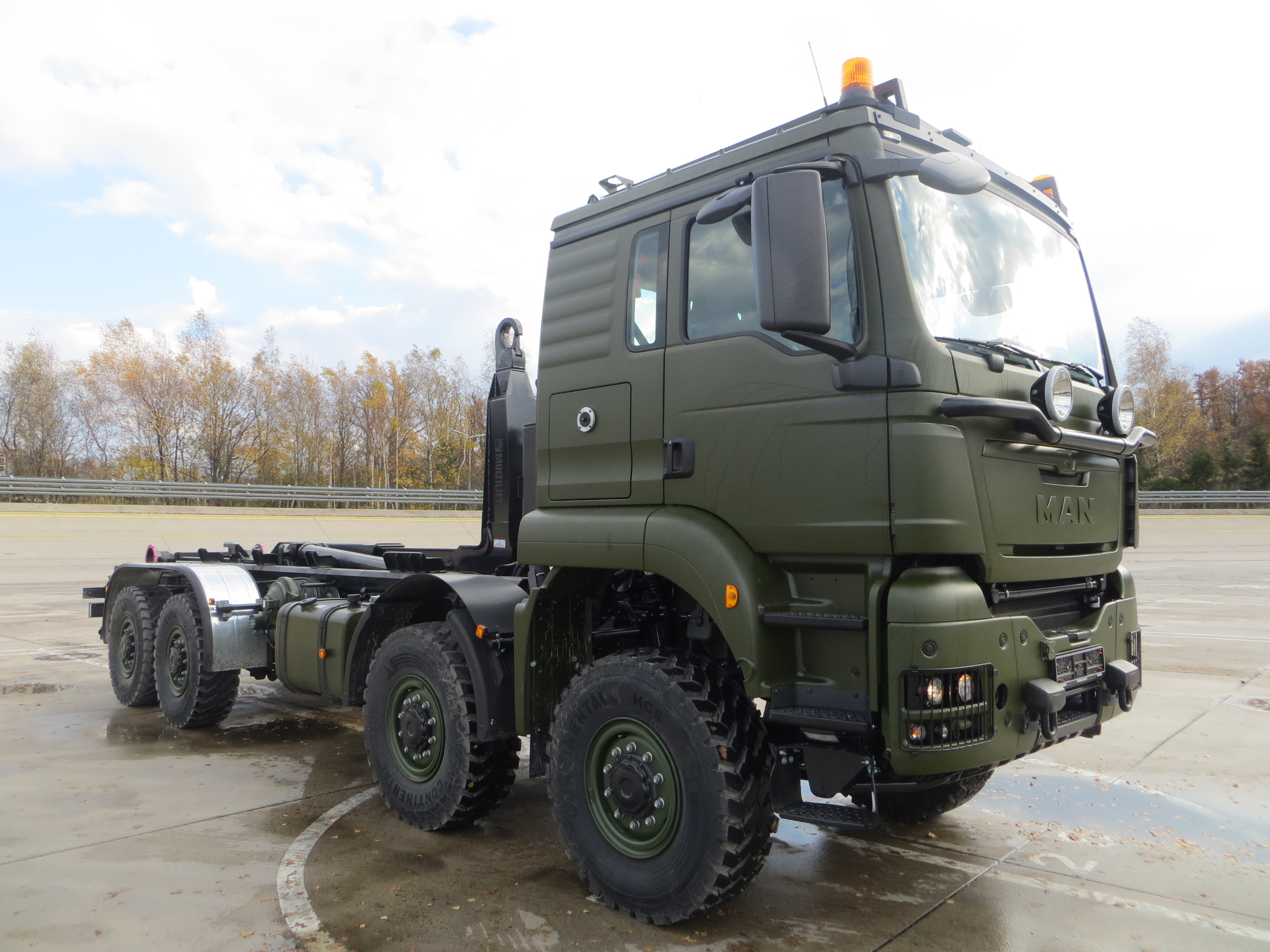
A TG MIL TGS (8x8), this example a Swedish Army trials vehicle

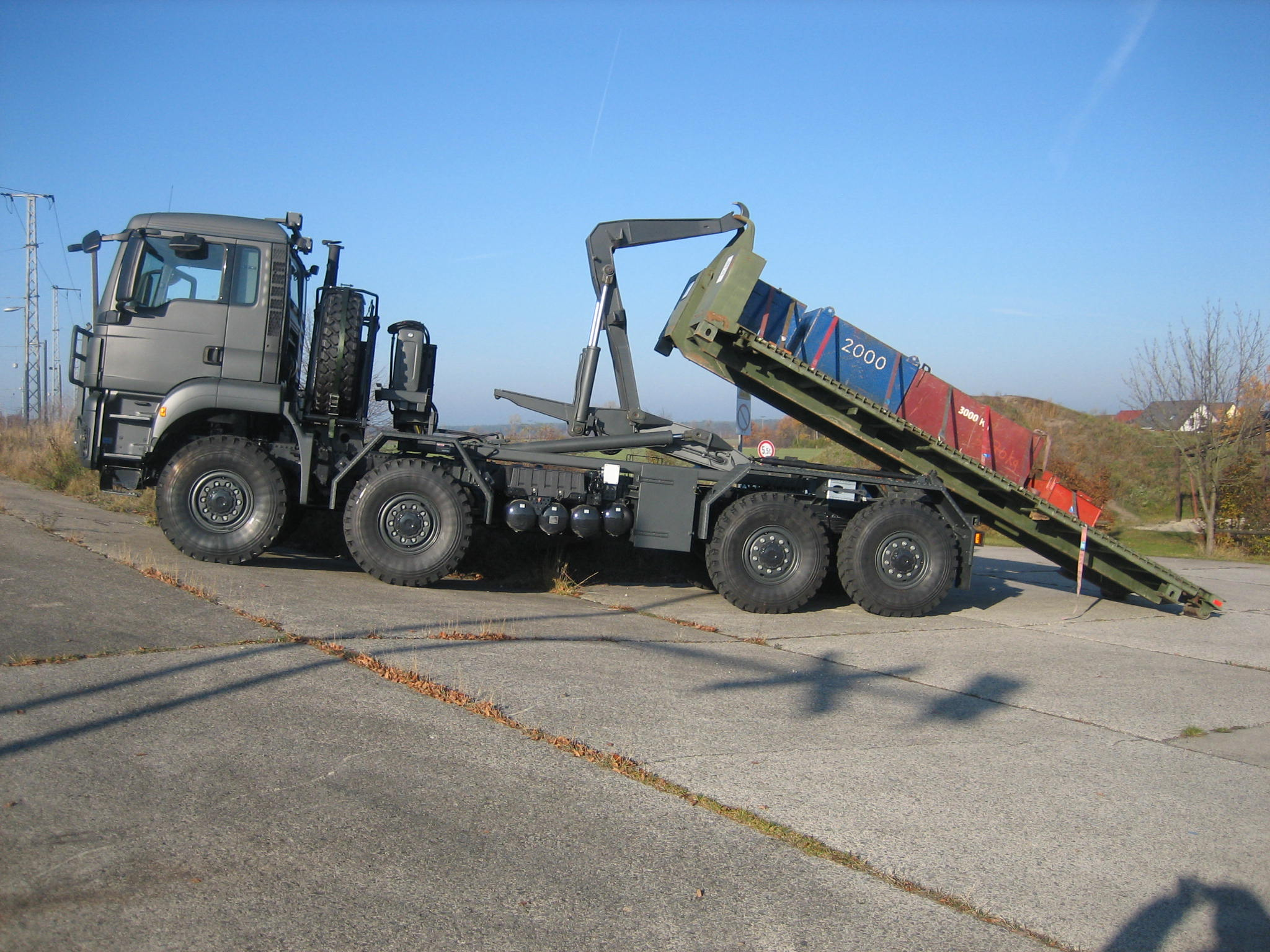
A TG MIL TGS (8x8) with hooklift-type load handling system.

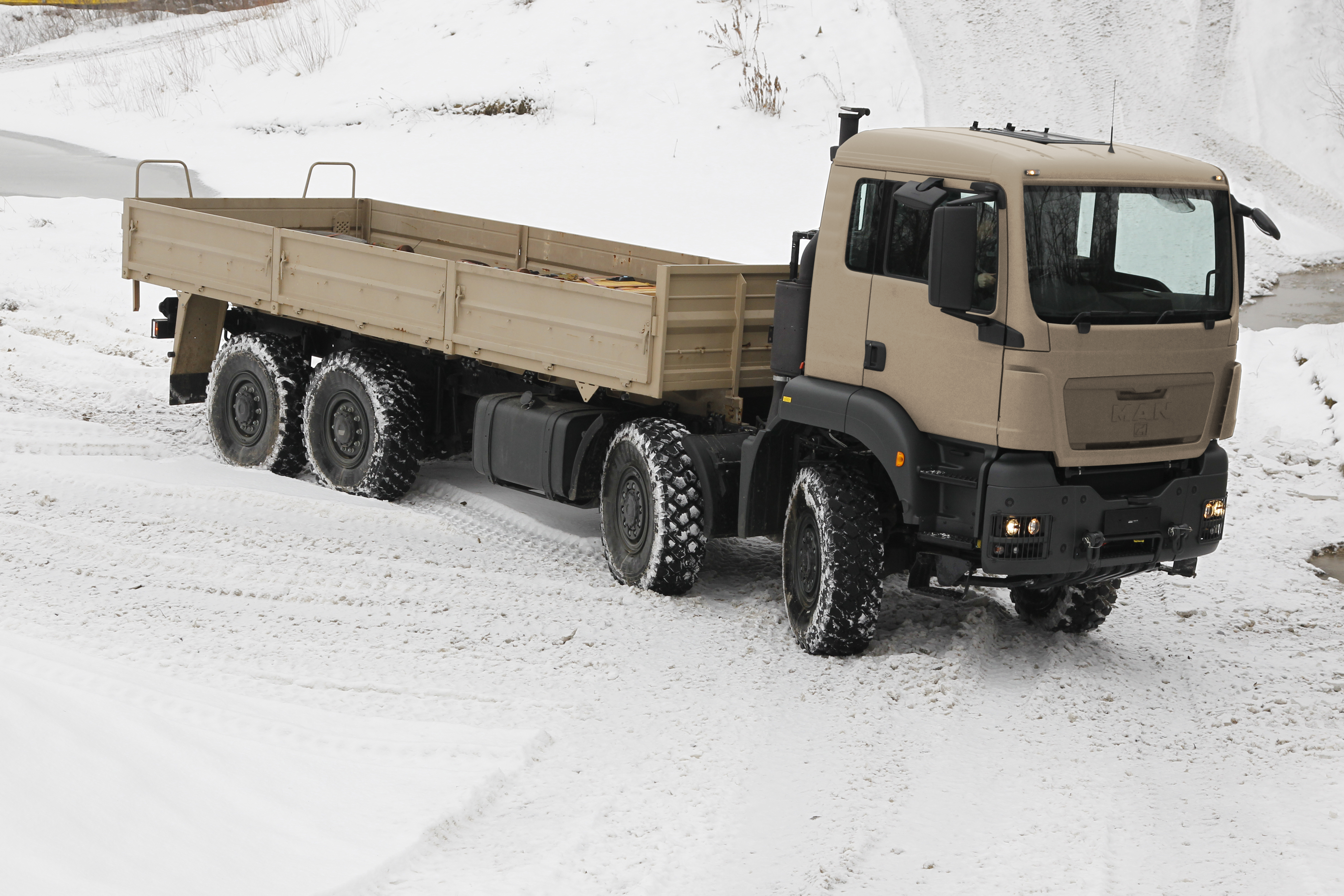
A TG MIL TGS (8x8)

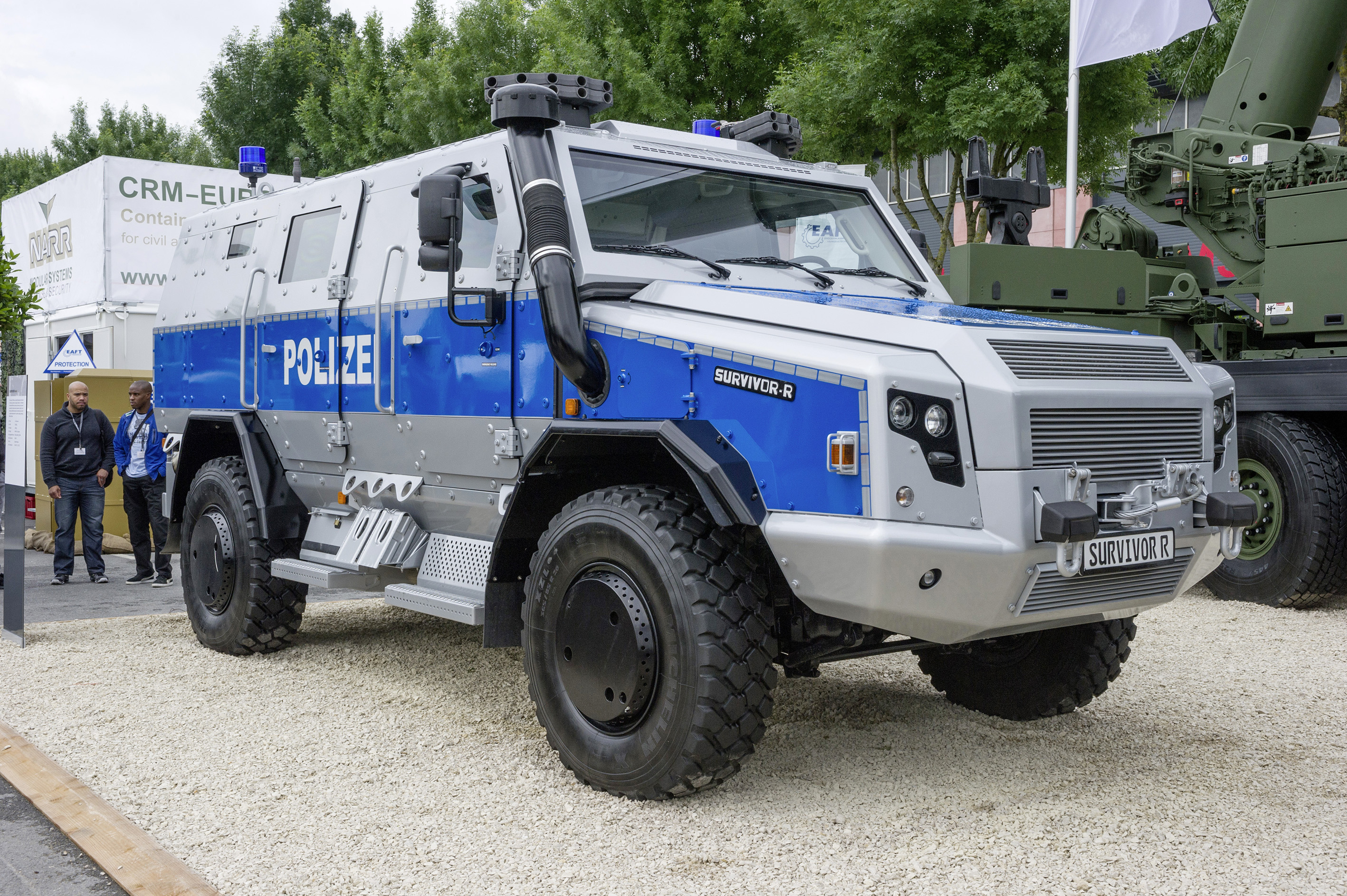
Survivor R is based on a TG MIL chassis

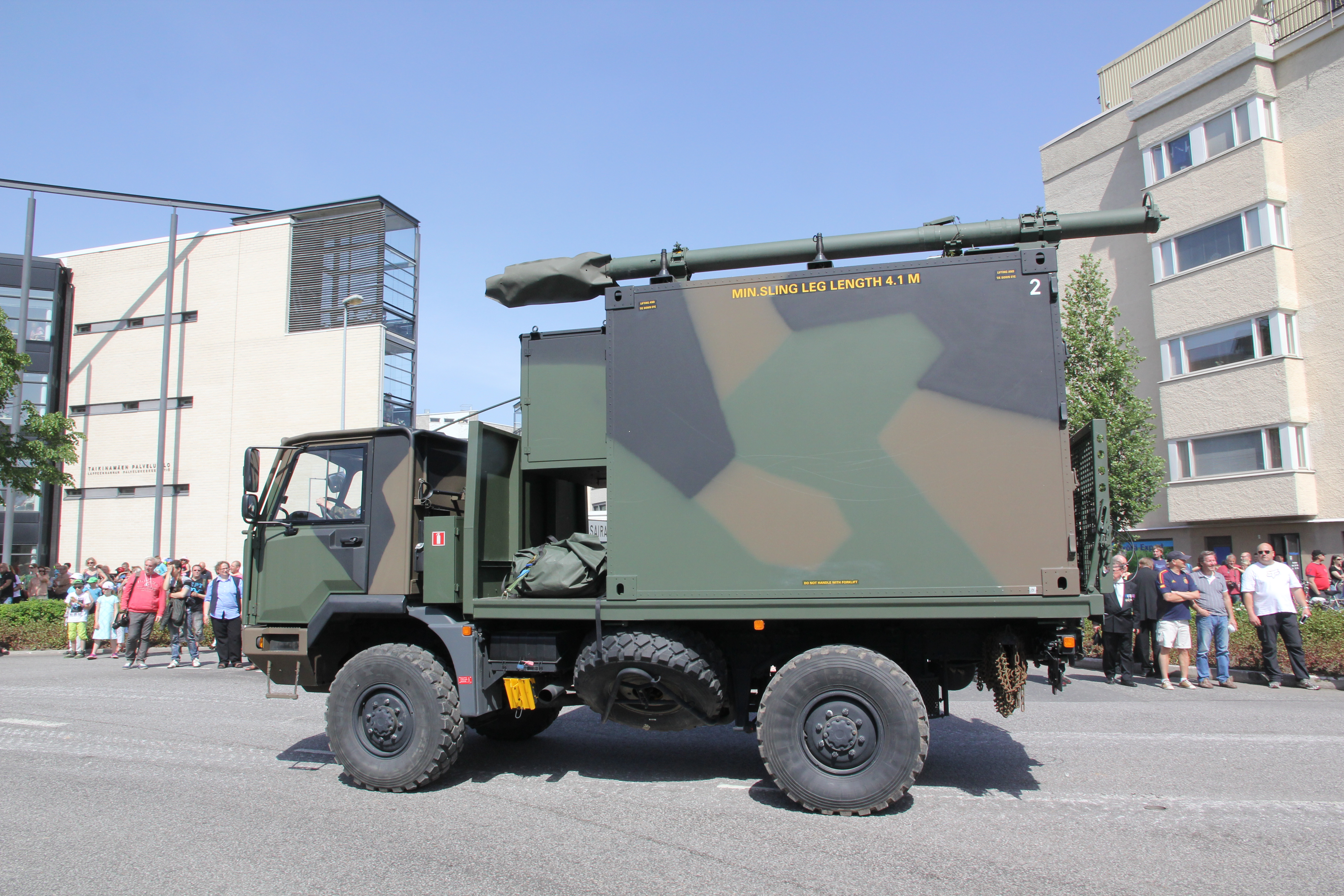
The Sisu A2045 (Finland) is based on a TG MIL TGM chassis

== Operators ==
(delivered with varying degrees of militarisation)

- Algeria - (TGA).
- Australia - (TGM, TGA).
- Austria - (TGM, TGA/TGS).
- Botswana - (TGM).
- Croatia - (TGS).
- Denmark - (TGM, TGA/TGS).
- Germany - (TGM, TGA/TGS).
- Georgia - (TGM)
- Greece - (TGM, TGA/TGS).
- Hungary - (TGS).
- Indonesia - (TGS).
- Malaysia - (TGM, TGS).
- Kuwait - (TGM, TGA/TGS).
- Norway - (TGS (order)).
- Oman - (TGM, TGA/TGS).
- Pakistan - (TGM).
- Philippines - (TGS).
- Poland - (TGA/TGS).
- Portugal - 47 TG-mil 4×4 + 61 TG-mil 6×6
- Qatar - (TGA/TGS).
- Saudi Arabia - (TGM, TGA/TGS).
- Serbia - (TGM).
- Singapore - (TGM, TGA/TGS).
- Spain - (TGM, TGA/TGS).
- Sweden - (TGS (order)).
- Taiwan - (TGS (order)).
- Turkmenistan - (TGS)
- UAE - (TGM, TGA/TGS).
- UK - (TGA).
- Yemen - (TGA/TGS) and others.
- According to the cited sources, the bulk of the above user information is obtained from third parties, RMMV/MAN often prohibited from comment on sales by confidentiality clauses/NDAs or similar.

== See also ==
- Rheinmetall MAN Military Vehicles (RMMV) HX range of tactical trucks
- MAN LX and FX ranges of tactical trucks - Predecessors of HX range
- MAN KAT1 - Predecessor of SX range, currently offered to complement HX range
- MAN SX - Successor to KAT1, currently complements HX range
- RMMV Survivor R - Wheeled armoured vehicle offered by RMMV
- YAK - Wheeled armoured vehicle offered by RMMV
- Armoured Multi-Purpose Vehicle - Wheeled light armoured/multirole vehicle offered by RMMV in a JV with KMW
- Boxer - Wheeled armoured vehicle offered by RMMV in a JV with KMW
- Rheinmetall MAN Military Vehicles - JV of MAN and Rheinmetall for wheeled vehicles
- TPz (Transportpanzer) Fuchs - Wheeled armoured personnel carrier
- List of modern equipment of the German Army
