= Timoney Technology Limited of Ireland =

Irish manufacturer

Timoney Technology Ltd.
- Type: Limited company
- Industry: Automotive industry, arms industry
- Founded: 1967
- Founders: Séamus Timoney
- Headquarters: Navan, County Meath
- Area served: Worldwide
- Key people: Shane O’Neill (CEO)
- Products: Suspension systems, vehicle design
- Subsidiaries: Timoney Aeronautics and Space Technologies
- Website: timoneygroup.com

Timoney Technology Limited of Ireland is an Irish company which designs, develops and manufactures powertrains and independent suspension systems for heavy duty trucks, motor coaches and military vehicles. Timoney designs and develops a variety of standard armoured and soft skin mobility systems for military, commercial and specialist applications, principally utilising an independent suspension technology.

== Military ==
=== Timoney Armoured Vehicles ===
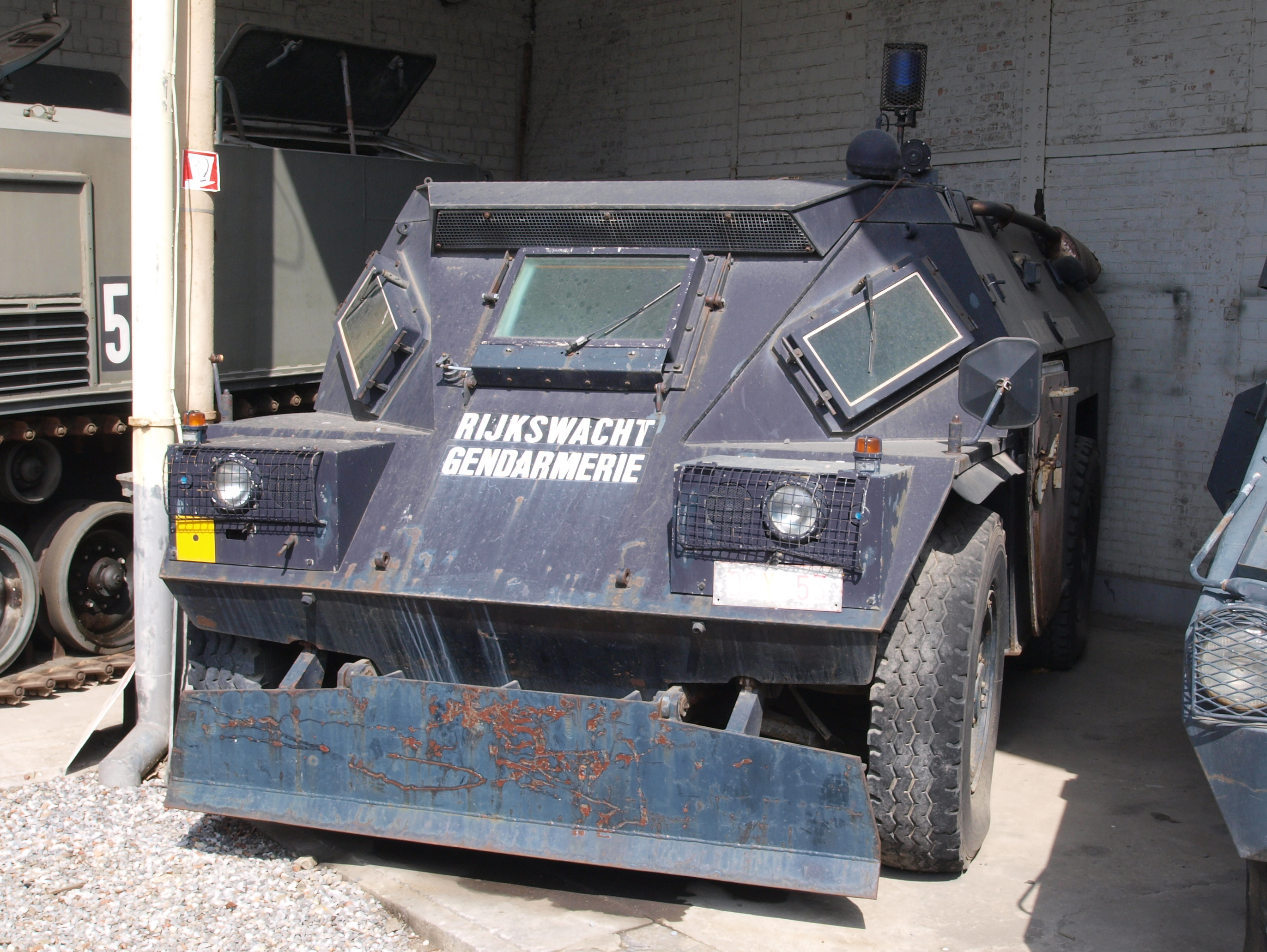
Belgian Gendarmerie BDX.

Timoney designed 4x4 wheeled APCs, designated Marks I, II, II (all prototypes). Five Mark IVs and five Mark VIs were also built for the Irish army.

From 1975 onwards, 123 Timoney Armoured Personnel Carriers Mark V were subsequently built under license by Beherman Demoen as the BDX in Belgium. The BDX was then used by the Belgian Air Force and the Belgian Gendarmerie. Further licence agreements and direct sales have resulted in deliveries to the UK, Argentina, Middle East, Africa and the Far East. Pre-owned examples were sold to Mexico where they are still in service.

=== Timoney Light Tank ===
At the beginning of the 1980s Timoney offered a new light tank design with a conventional layout (driver in front, engine in the rear) in the 12-15 ton weight range, depending on armament fitted. Power was provided by a six-cylinder Detroit Diesel 6V53T engine developing 320 horsepower. It was intended to use a hydropneumatic suspension design steered by a Timoney hydromechanical system. The vehicle was protected by "specially contoured" armour and a low profile of just over 2 metres. The main armament was likely going to be a 90mm Cockerill cannon and it was "highly probable" electronics, sighting, and fire-control system could be configured to customer needs. The vehicle reportedly resembled the American High Survivability Test Vehicle/Light (HSTV/L) (see: Armored Gun System#ARMVAL) and a prototype was advertised as being available soon. The design was not purchased by any military.

=== Bronco All Terrain Tracked Carrier ===
In 1994, Timoney was contracted by Singapore Technologies Kinetics to develop the power pack and drive train for the Bronco ATTC. The system included front and rear axles, an integrated transfer box and the track system final drive units. Timoney has been the sole supplier of these components since the vehicle entered series production in 1999 following a contract award from the Singapore Armed Forces. The Bronco resembles an enlarged BvS 10.

=== Australian-built Bushmaster IMV ===
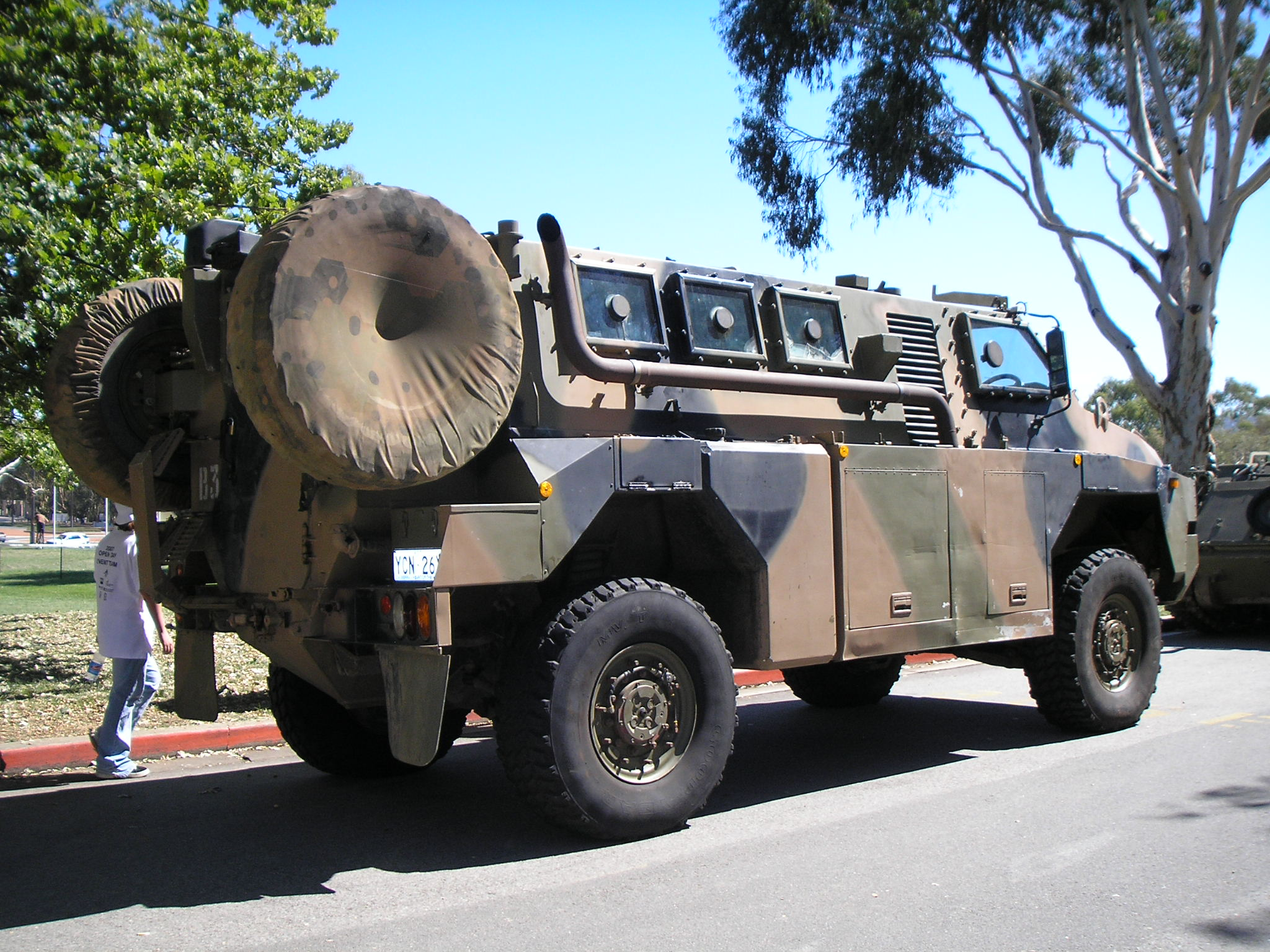
A pre-production Bushmaster

In 1999, ADI Ltd (later known as Thales Australia), a licensee of designs and technology developed by Timoney, was awarded a contract to manufacture 350 infantry mobility vehicles (IMV) for the Australian Defence Force (ADF). This vehicle, the Bushmaster, was based on the Timoney MP44. Its hull design provided high levels of ballistic and mine protection. Outstanding mobility and crew comfort were achieved by use of a Timoney independent suspension system. The majority of Australia's Bushmasters have been allocated to the Army, though 12 are operated by the Royal Australian Air Force's Airfield Defence Guards.

The Australian-built Bushmaster was also selected by the Dutch military for peace keeping and internal security roles. In July 2006 the Dutch Government announced an urgent purchase of 25 Bushmasters, to equip Royal Netherlands Army units operating in Afghanistan. Bushmasters were also subsequently ordered for the British Army, Japan Ground Self Defense Force, Indonesian Army, Fiji Infantry Regiment, Jamaica Defence Force and New Zealand Army.

In a live video address to the Australian Parliament on 31 March 2022, Ukraine President Volodymyr Zelenskyy requested Bushmasters, by name, for the use of the Ukrainian Armed Forces in their war against Russia. Though there was some discussion initially of Australia buying back Bushmasters in Dutch service, to speed delivery to Ukraine, it was decided that 20 new and unused vehicles intended for the ADF would be donated. This initial shipment was completed several weeks after Zelenskyy's request, and the Bushmasters were put into combat service almost immediately. On two subsequent occasions over the next few months, two further shipments of 20 vehicles each were also promised to Ukraine by the Australian government; once delivered, these would have brought the total number of Bushmasters in Ukrainian service to 60 vehicles.

=== Crusher Unmanned Ground Combat Vehicle ===
Timoney Technology developed the traction and suspension system for the unmanned Darpa UPI Crusher vehicle. The suspension has an unprecedented 800+mm of wheel travel and is equipped with full ride height control, and temperature and load compensation. The wheel hubs are driven by direct mounted traction motors and are equipped with a central tyre inflation system, which, when combined with the suspension afford Crusher unparalleled mobility in all terrains.

=== Terrex AFV Family ===
The Terrex AV81 was initially developed in 2000 by Timoney for Singapore Technologies Kinetics. The initial design utilised conventional coil springs shock absorbers but later variants have seen the introduction of hydro-pneumatic struts with real-time damping control. An electric-hybrid drive system was also developed.

The Terrex AV82 was developed in 2005 equipped with a more advanced driveline and hydro-pneumatic suspension system. Development of this driveline involving new traction control systems and rear wheel steering continues.

=== CM31 ===
The CM31 6x6 IFV, both in APC and SAM configurations, was produced in limited numbers for the ROC Army and are based on the Timoney Mark 8. They have been replaced in production by the CM32.

=== CM32 ===
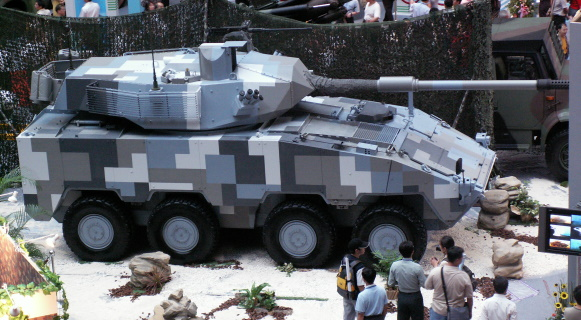
The CM32 armoured vehicle, currently under production (mobile-gun platform variant)

The CM32 8x8 IFV is a further development of the 6x6 CM31. The Taipei Times reported that the AIFV has been chosen by the ROC military as its next wheeled armoured fighting vehicle. The AIFV is being built under license in Taiwan with a full transfer of technology.

Reports in September 2003 stated that Taiwan would be going ahead with its decision to procure a locally developed and manufactured 8x8 IFV. The project was launched in 2002, at a cost of NT$700 million (US$21.9 million).

Mass production started in 2007, with an initial order for 600 units. It is estimated that up to 1,400 CM32s may end up being in operational service.

On 11 January 2005, Taiwan officially named the 8x8 "Yunpao" ("Clouded Leopard") at a ceremony attended by President Chen Shui-bian.

=== Rheinmetall ===
In October 2010, Rheinmetall MAN Military Vehicles agreed to cooperate with Timoney Technology; Timoney would make independent suspension and transmission systems for new types of RMMV vehicles. The first example is the Wisent.

=== Sales to Russia ===
Timoney Technology has supplied parts to Russia in 2012 that may have been used in the invasion of Ukraine. There is evidence that University College Dublin, IDA Ireland and Enterprise Ireland have provided support for Timoney Technology.
