= RMMV Survivor R =

Survivor R
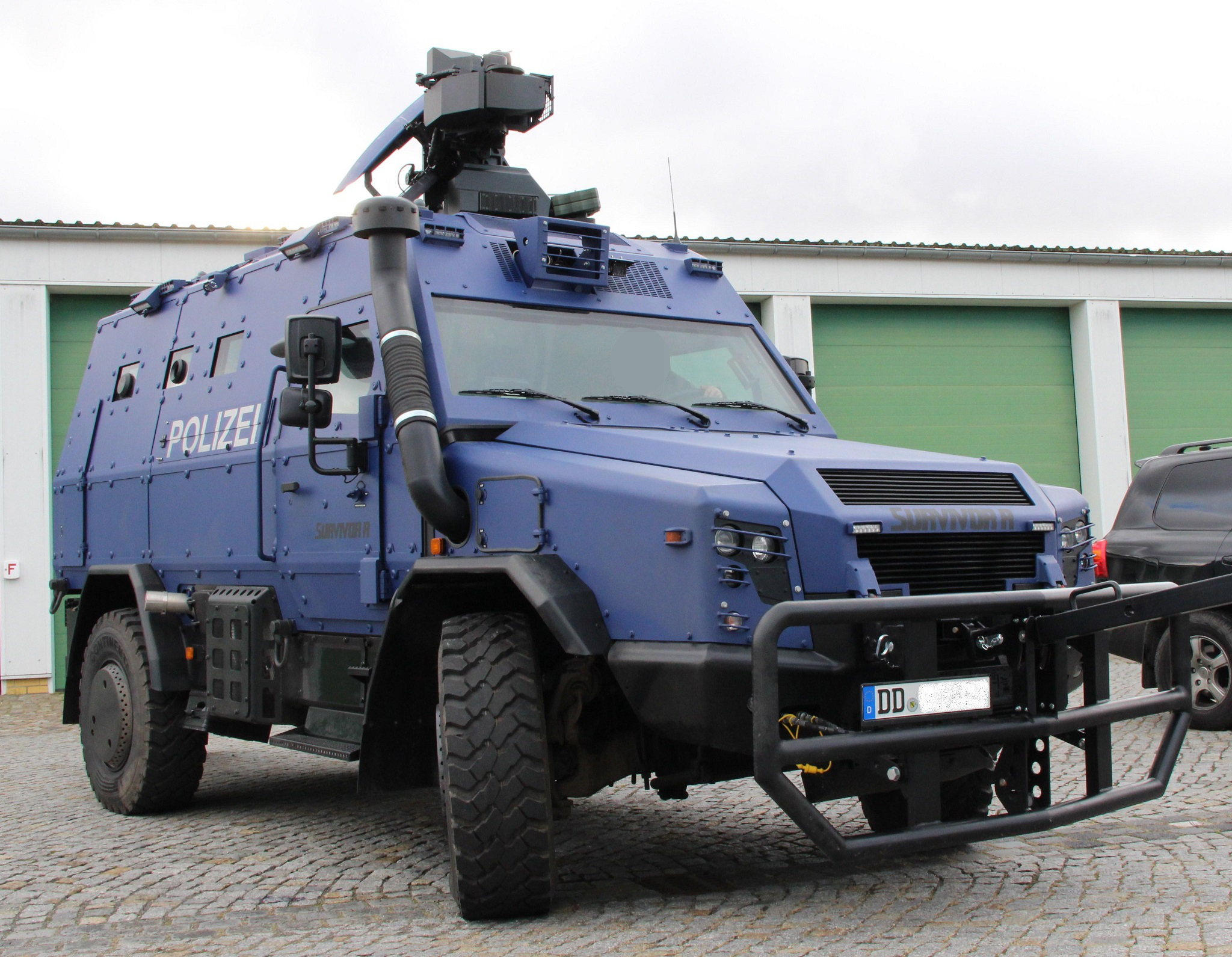
- The first of two Saxony State Police Survivor R
- Type: Infantry mobility vehicle
- Place of origin: Germany/Austria

Service history
- Used by: See Operators

Production history
- Designer: RMMV/Achleitner
- Manufacturer: RMMV/Achleitner
- Produced: 2017 onwards

Specifications
- Mass: 15 tonnes GVW
- Length: 6.5 m
- Width: 2.5 m
- Height: 2.7 m (roof; standard configuration)
- Crew: 2 + up to 10 in rear
- Armor: steel, classified
- Engine: MAN 6.9-litre 6-cylinder 4-stroke Euro 3 (Euro 5 option) water-cooled 4-stroke diesel 330 hp and 1250 Nm torque
- Transmission: MAN 12 AS 1210 Tipmatic 12-speed automated gearbox coupled to a MAN G 103 2-speed transfer case
- Suspension: parabolic leaf springs, shock-absorbers and anti-roll bar

The RMMV Survivor R (presented SURVIVOR R by the company) is a medium-weight armoured-wheeled vehicle developed jointly as the result of a strategic co-operation between Germany’s Rheinmetall MAN Military Vehicles (RMMV) and Austria’s Achleitner. Survivor R was publicly displayed for the first time at Eurosatory 2014. The first sale of Survivor R was announced in March 2017.

== Development ==
The co-operation between RMMV and Achleitner is intended to combine the capabilities of a mid-size vehicle manufacturer with the market presence and corporate resources of a large defense multinational corporation. Survivor R, which adds a 15-tonne GVW class protected wheeled vehicle to RMMV's portfolio of multirole vehicles, is the initial result of this co-operation.

When shown for the first time at Eurosatory 2014, Survivor R was configured for the chemical, biological, radiological and nuclear role. Survivor R was then shown at IDEX 2015 held in Abu Dhabi 22–26 February. This was the first time the vehicle had been shown in the Middle East, and the first time it had been shown in command and control configuration. Survivor R has since been shown in ambulance configuration (DSEi 2015) and Police/law enforcement configuration (Eurosatory 2016).

During June 2016 the UK Ministry of Defence confirmed that the five international companies had been shortlisted to compete for the final stages of the Package 2 element of the Multi Role Vehicle-Protected (MRV-P) program. According to a report in Defense News, Survivor R was one of the five downselected for this requirement which would initially require 150 troop carrying vehicles and 80 ambulances but incremental orders would take eventually the numbers up to 300 of each. In February 2017 it was disclosed that RMMV had withdrawn from the competition.

The first sale of Survivor R was announced in March 2017, this to the Free State of Saxony, Germany. The first vehicle was delivered on 15 December, with the second scheduled for delivery prior to Christmas.

The second sale of Survivor R was announced in November 2017. The Berlin Police have ordered a vehicle tailored to the requirements of the Operations Directorate. The vehicle was delivered in July 2018 and the order was stated to be worth a six-figure euro amount.

On November 21, 2017, the Survivor Special Operations Vehicle concept was unveiled to the public at Milipol 2017.

== Description ==
To minimise both initial procurement and through life costs, Survivor R is based on a militarised MAN TGM 18-tonne gross vehicle weight (GVW) commercial truck chassis and automotives.

Survivor R uses only series-produced COTS components, with the bulk of the militarisation required integrated into the TGM production line at MAN's truck plant in Steyr, Austria. Through-life support will be based on the worldwide service, support and manufacturing networks of Rheinmetall and MAN, this ensuring the Survivor R can offer users supportability, high levels of operational availability and genuine service longevity.

Survivor R is powered by a high-sulphur fuel tolerant MAN 6.9-litre, 6-cylinder water-cooled diesel engine, this rated at EURO 3 or EURO 6 emissions compliance and (at EURO 6) developing 340 hp and 1,250 Nm torque. A MAN 12 AS 1210 Tipmatic 12-speed automated gearbox and MAN G 103 2-speed transfer box are fitted. The MAN front axle is rated at 7.1-tonnes, the rear at 11.5-tonnes. Suspension is by parabolic leaf springs, shock-absorbers and anti-roll bars. Standard tyres are 365/85 R 20 Michelin XZL fitted with Hutchinson run flat inserts

Survivor R's armoured steel monocoque cabin provides undisclosed STANAG-compliant levels of protection and one of the highest internal volumes in its class. With an unladen weight of 10.9-tonnes and up to 4.1-tonnes of military payload the Survivor R offers a respectable payload-to-weight ratio. This combination of protection, workspace and payload makes Survivor R well suited to requirements involving complex systems integrations.

Survivor R is air transportable by C-130 Hercules transport aircraft.

Optional equipment includes a central tyre inflation system, a fully automatic gearbox, a 10-tonne hydraulic self-recovery winch and a dozer blade.

RMMV lists numerous potential roles and applications as suited to the Survivor R, these including an internal security and/or law enforcement vehicle, riot control, trauma management/ambulance, a command and control vehicle, and logistics version with a rear cargo body.

== Displayed variants ==
The primary mission of the CBRN reconnaissance variant will be to detect, identify, mark, sample and report chemical, biological and radiological contamination and provide forecast information to units deployed in the area of operations.

The CBRN Survivor R is equipped with fully automated detectors for nuclear radiation as well as sensors for identifying chemical warfare agents and other hazardous materials. These include a remote standoff sensor for detecting distant clouds of chemical agents, providing immediate analysis and warning. Moreover, the CBRN Survivor R can operate on the move.

In addition to its inherent identification capabilities the system can collect samples from soil, water, and ground for later reference analysis. It allows real-time transmission of all relevant CBRN information up the chain of command as well as immediate marking of contaminated areas to enhance the survivability and mobility of ground forces.

As shown at Eurosatory, the Survivor R CBRN variant was equipped with a comprehensive suite of CBRN detection equipment including an OWR sampling system, a Bruker MM mass spectrometer and a RMMV NBC Inspector.

When shown at IDEX 2015 the Survivor R command and control variant was displayed fitted with a battle management system, roof-mounted Kongsberg Nordic remote weapon station armed with a .50 machine gun, and banks of Rheinmetall, ROSY grenade launchers. This latest version of the Survivor R features twin doors at the rear, which allows it to be used for other roles, such as specialised ambulance, for which the vehicle could be fitted with equipment to assist in rapidly loading stretcher patients into the vehicle.

At DESI 2015, RMMV displayed Survivor R in a field ambulance configuration. In the configuration shown, the vehicle is able to transport two casualties on stretchers or three seated casualties plus one stretcher accompanied by two medical attendants. The medical equipment is comparable to a civilian paramedic ambulance. It contains advanced procedure equipment, heart monitors, medications and other supplies necessary to provide lifesaving tactical combat casualty care.

At Eurosatory 2016, RMMV displayed Survivor R in a Police/law enforcement configuration.

When marketed by Achleitner the slightly revised design is known as PMV Survivor II. The easiest way to differentiate the Survivor R from the PMV Survivor II is the differing bonnet style.

== Operators ==
=== Survivor R ===
- Germany

Following German state police forces (German: Landespolizei) use Survivor R vehicles under the denomination Sonderwagen 5:

  - Hamburg Police - two vehicles
  - Berlin Police - one vehicle delivered in December 2018
  - Saxony State Police - two examples ordered in March 2017. The vehicles form part of an extensive €15 million anti-terror package and are used to equip special police units in Saxony. The first example was delivered on December 15.
  - North Rhine-Westphalia Police - one vehicle delivered in December 2018
- Hamburg Police - two Survivor II
- German Federal Police 10 vehicles + 45 vehicles for unspecified Landespolizei forces - Survivor R ordered as 'Sonderwagen 5' + 35 options

=== PMV Survivor II ===
- Austria
  - EKO Cobra
  - WEGA unit
- Turkmenistan
  - Border Guard - Between 10 and 15 ordered around 2015.

== Gallery ==
RMMV Survivor R

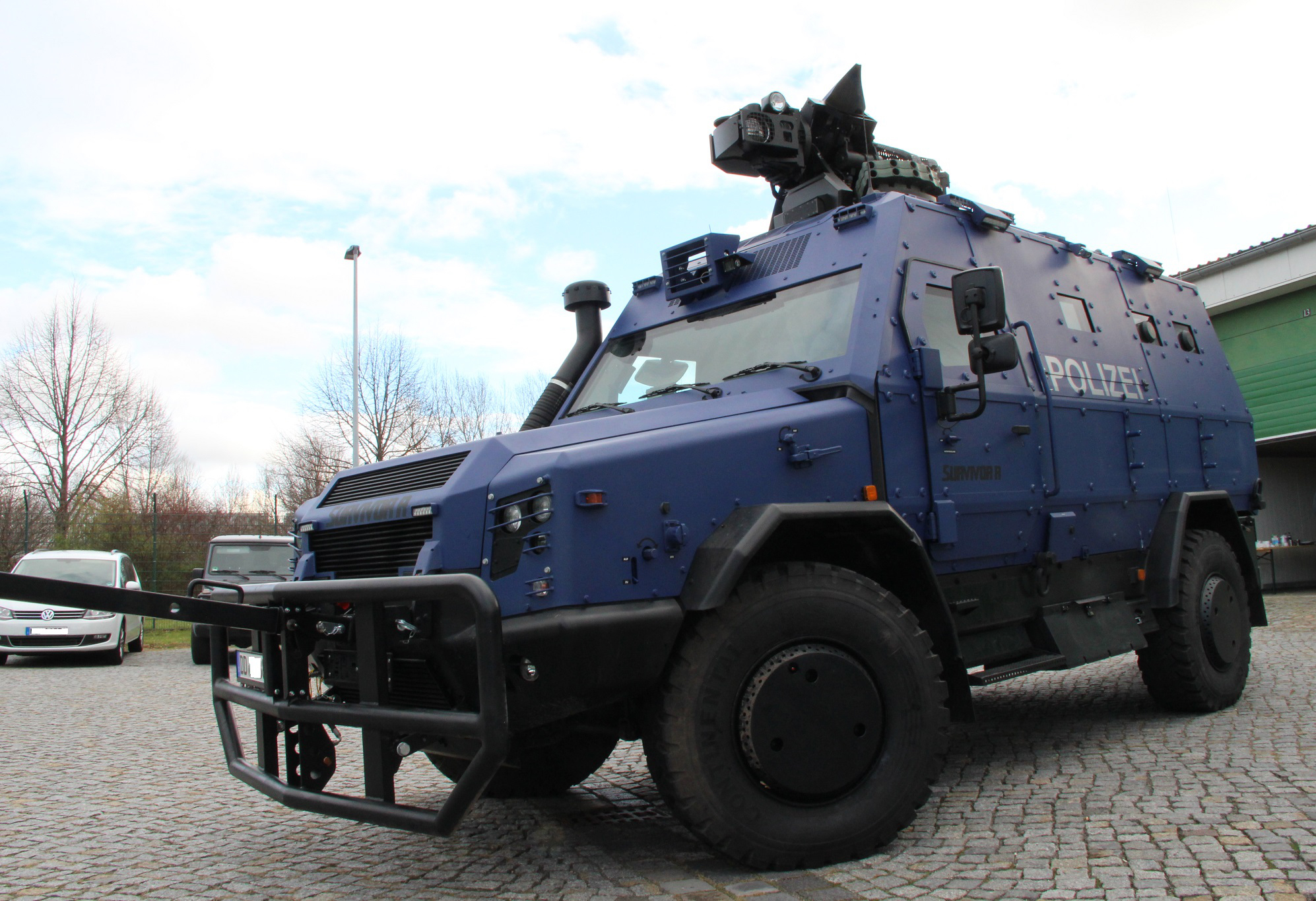
The first of two Saxony State Police Survivor R Sonderwagen 5

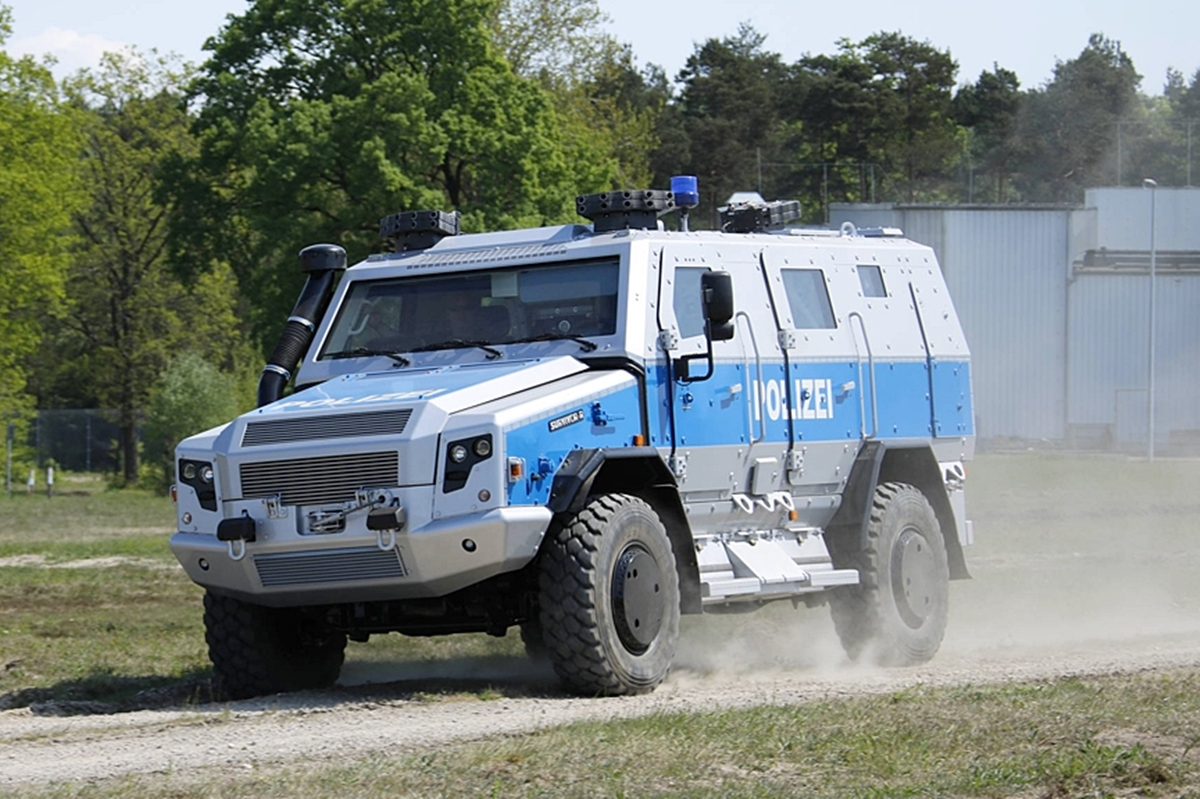
Survivor R in Police configuration

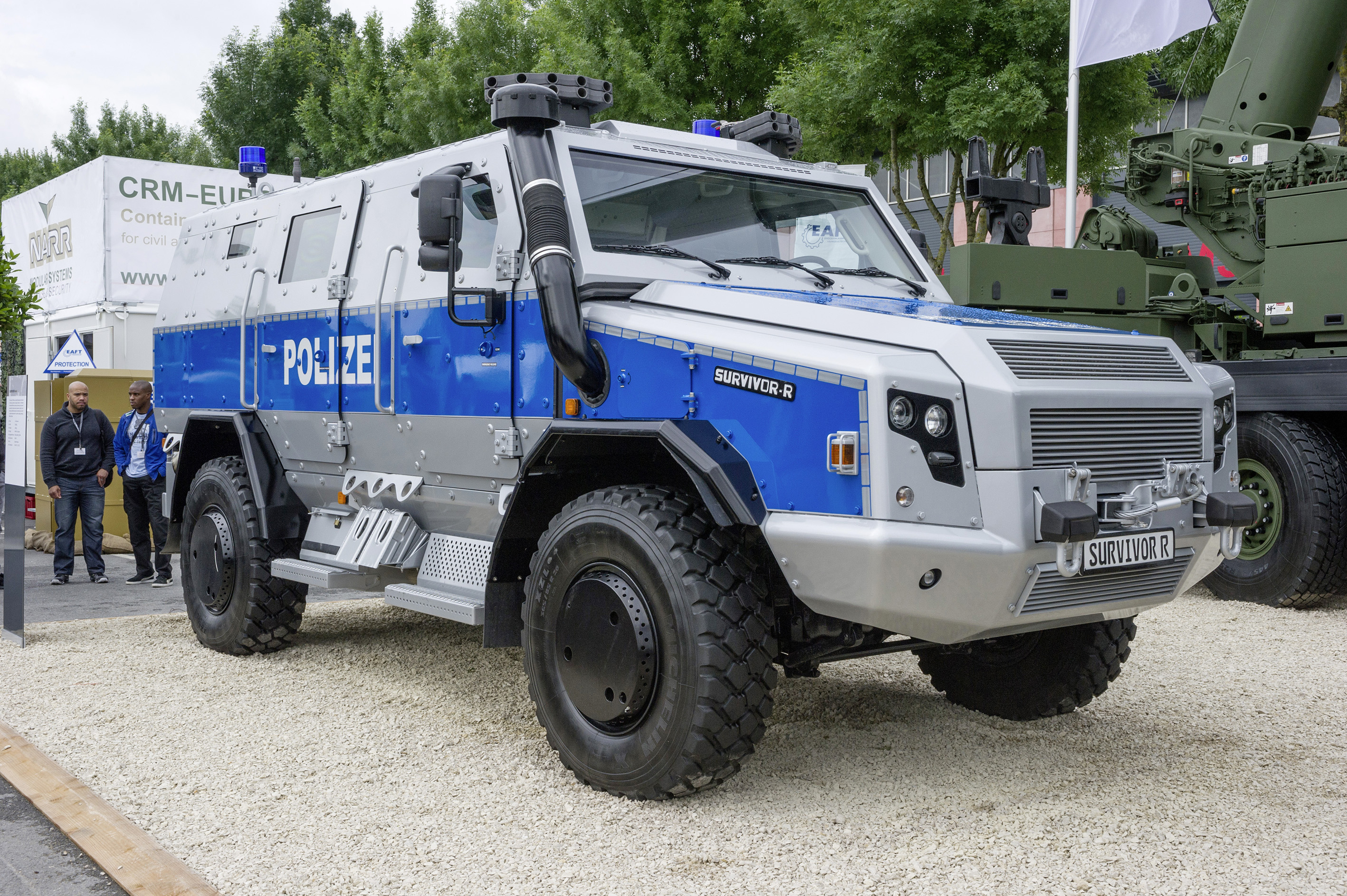
Survivor R in Police configuration as shown at Eurosatory

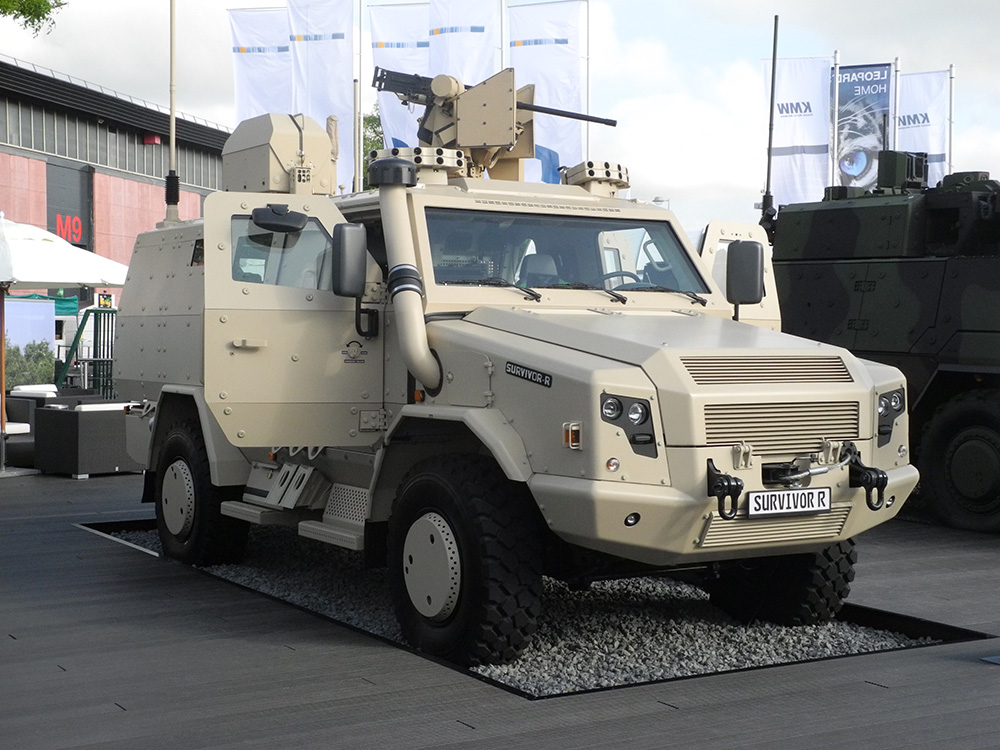
RMMV Survivor R at Eurosatory 2013

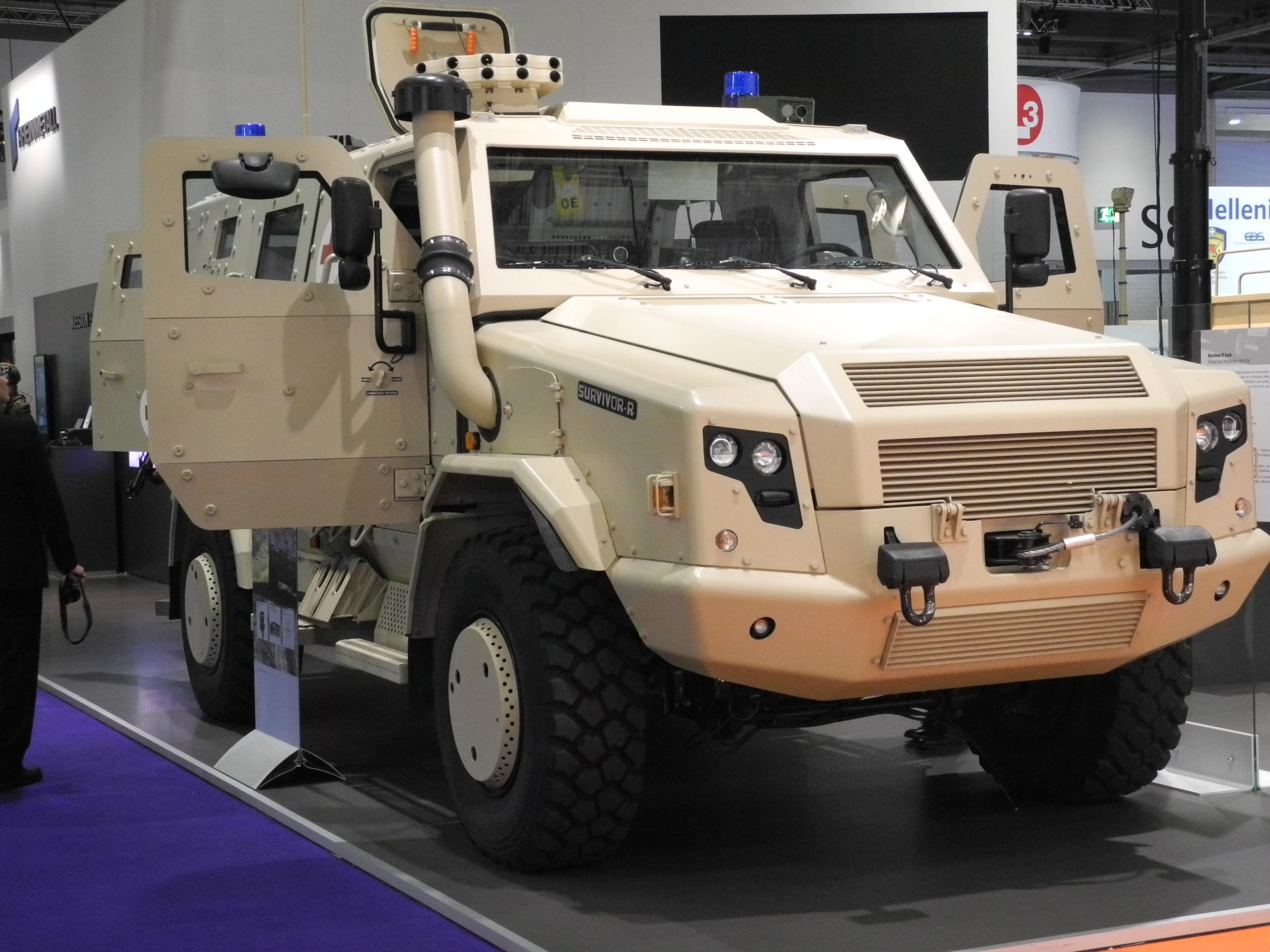
As displayed at DSEi 2015, Survivor R in ambulance configuration
