= Achleitner =

Achleitner is a German surname. Notable people with the surname include:

- Ann-Kristin Achleitner, German economist
- Arthur Achleitner (1858–1927), German writer
- Friedrich Achleitner (1930–2019), Austrian architect, poet, and writer
- Georg Achleitner (1806–1883), Austrian politician
- Hubert Achleitner, known as "Hubert von Goisern" (born 1952), Austrian musician
- Paul Achleitner (born 1956), Austrian economic manager

== See also ==
- Patricia Mayr-Achleitner (born 1986), Austrian tennis player
