= Wisent (vehicle) =

- Type: 8x8 off-road cargo truck
- Place of origin: Germany

Production history
- Designer: Rheinmetall MAN Military Vehicles
- Produced: 2008-

Specifications
- Mass: 26t empty
- Engine: MAN diesel 430hp
- Transmission: ZF 7-speed automatic
- Operational range: 700km
- Maximum speed: 105km/h (road)

The Wisent is an 8x8 armoured logistics vehicle built by Rheinmetall. It is designed to be airliftable by the Airbus A400M.

It can be fitted with various modules, for cargo carrying, medical use, troop transport, and so on.

The Wisent can also be fitted with various weapons, including an RCWS.
