= Rheinmetall MAN Military Vehicles =

German joint venture company

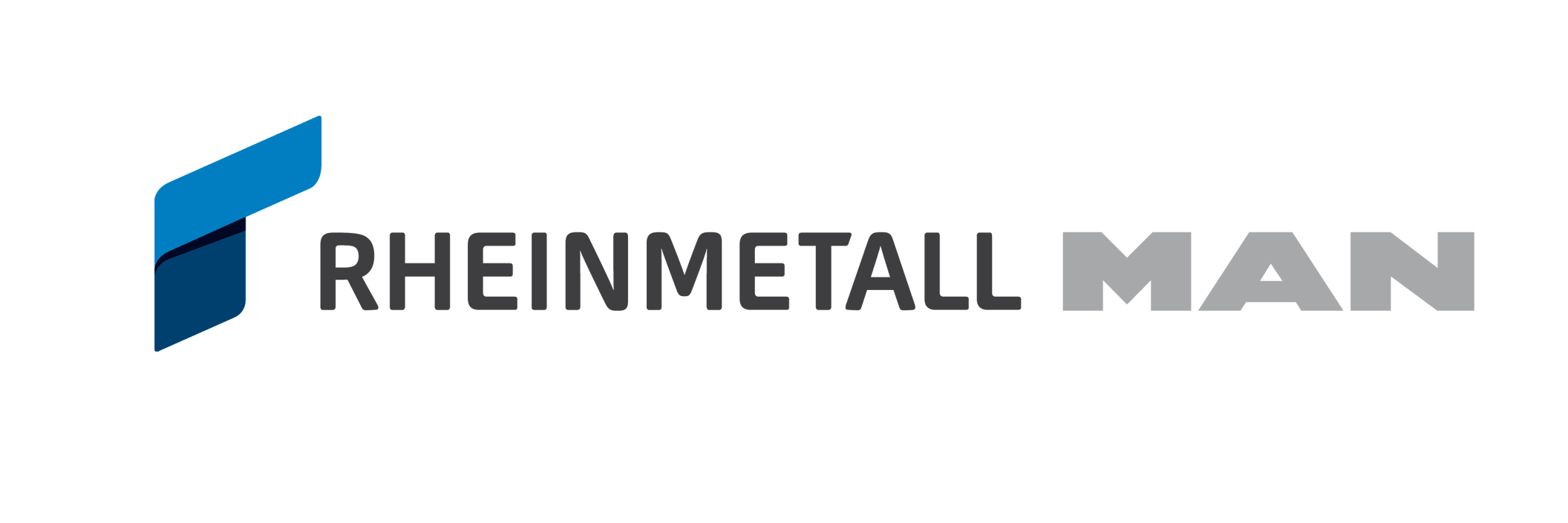
- Company type: GmbH
- Industry: defence company
- Founded: 1 May 2010; 15 years ago
- Headquarters: Munich, Bavaria, Germany
- Area served: worldwide
- Key people: Business Unit Logistic Vehicles: Ludwig Ostler (CEO); André Barthel (CFO); Heiko Kayser (COO); MAN Truck & Bus AG: Joachim Drees
- Owners: Rheinmetall (51%); MAN Truck & Bus (49%)
- Number of employees: 1,500
- Website: RMMV

Rheinmetall MAN Military Vehicles GmbH (RMMV) is a joint venture company between German companies MAN Truck & Bus AG and Rheinmetall AG. RMMV is part of Rheinmetall's Vehicle Systems Division. Rheinmetall AG holds a 51% stake in RMMV, with the remaining 49% held by MAN Truck & Bus. RMMV was initially a provider to security and armed forces of a wide range of armoured and unarmoured transport, command and role-specific wheeled vehicles, but since 2019 and a restructure has focused on military specific and militarised commercial trucks.

== Company evolution ==
In 2009 the then MAN Nutzfahrzeuge AG (now MAN Truck & Bus AG) and Rheinmetall AG announced their respective intentions to form a joint wheeled military vehicles company. The alliance became a legal reality in May 2010. RMMV was originally the merger of Rheinmetall's wheeled military vehicle activities with those of the military truck activities of MAN. The aim of this merger was to combine the complementary technological core competencies of MAN's automotive expertise in commercial-vehicle manufacture with Rheinmetall's technological know-how in the military land sector/systems field. The result of this merger was the creation of a single-source provider for a wide range of armoured and unarmoured transport, command and role-specific wheeled vehicles.

As a first step, the development and sales activities of both companies was transferred to RMMV effective 1 May 2010. The first public appearance of the RMMV was at IDEB 2010 in Bratislava. In October 2010, Rheinmetall MAN Military Vehicles agreed to cooperate with driveline specialist Timoney Technology. The first example of this partnership was the Wisent.

In a second contractually agreed step, by the end of 2011 the relevant production facilities of the partner companies were to be integrated into the joint venture structure, though they were remain at their present locations in Kassel, Germany (Rheinmetall) and Vienna, Austria (MAN). During the first phase, RMMV had approximately 370 employees. Following completion of the second phase, the company's staff steadily increased to a maximum level of around 1,800.

From January 2016 RMMV has operated as part of the wider Rheinmetall Vehicle Systems. From 2016 Rheinmetall Defence (the defence arm of the Rheinmetall Group) has operated as three divisions; Vehicle Systems; Electronic Solutions; and Weapons and Ammunition. In July 2019 Rheinmetall announced that the company was pursuing a buyback of some shares held by MAN Truck & Bus in the RMMV joint venture (JV) company, specifically 100% of shares in the tactical vehicle segment of the business. As of September 2019, RMMV (which remains a 51/49% JV) only produces military and militarised trucks (including protected), with tactical vehicles now produced by 100% Rheinmetall-owned Rheinmetall Military Vehicles.

RMMV's headquarters is in Munich, with the main competence center for the production of protected and unprotected trucks being a production plant in Vienna. Current subsidiary companies are Rheinmetall MAN Military Vehicles Österreich GesmbH, Rheinmetall MAN Military Vehicles Australia Pty Ltd and Rheinmetall MAN Military Vehicles UK Ltd.

== Products ==
(current portfolio)

- HX range of tactical trucks
- TG MIL range of militarised commercial trucks

(part of the pre-2019 portfolio)

- Boxer multirole wheeled (8x8) armoured vehicle
- TPz (Transportpanzer) Fuchs ("Fox") (6x6) armoured personnel carrier (APC)
- Survivor R medium weight multirole wheeled (4x4) vehicle (TG truck based).
- Armoured Multi-Purpose Vehicle (AMPV), a light (4x4) multirole armoured vehicle
- YAK multirole wheeled (6x6) armoured vehicle

Armoured tracked vehicles such as the Lynx infantry fighting vehicle and Leopard main battle tank have always been products of Rheinmetall's Vehicle Systems Division (VSD) portfolio, and as tracked platforms were never part of the RMMV joint venture.

Products (legacy)

- SX range of tactical trucks (replaced by HX models from 2019)
- LX and FX ranges of tactical trucks (replaced by HX)
- KAT 1 range of tactical trucks (replaced by SX)
- MAN/Steyr/OAF brand militarised L2000, M2000, TGL, TGM, TGA commercial trucks (replaced by TG-MIL)

== RMMV portfolio ==
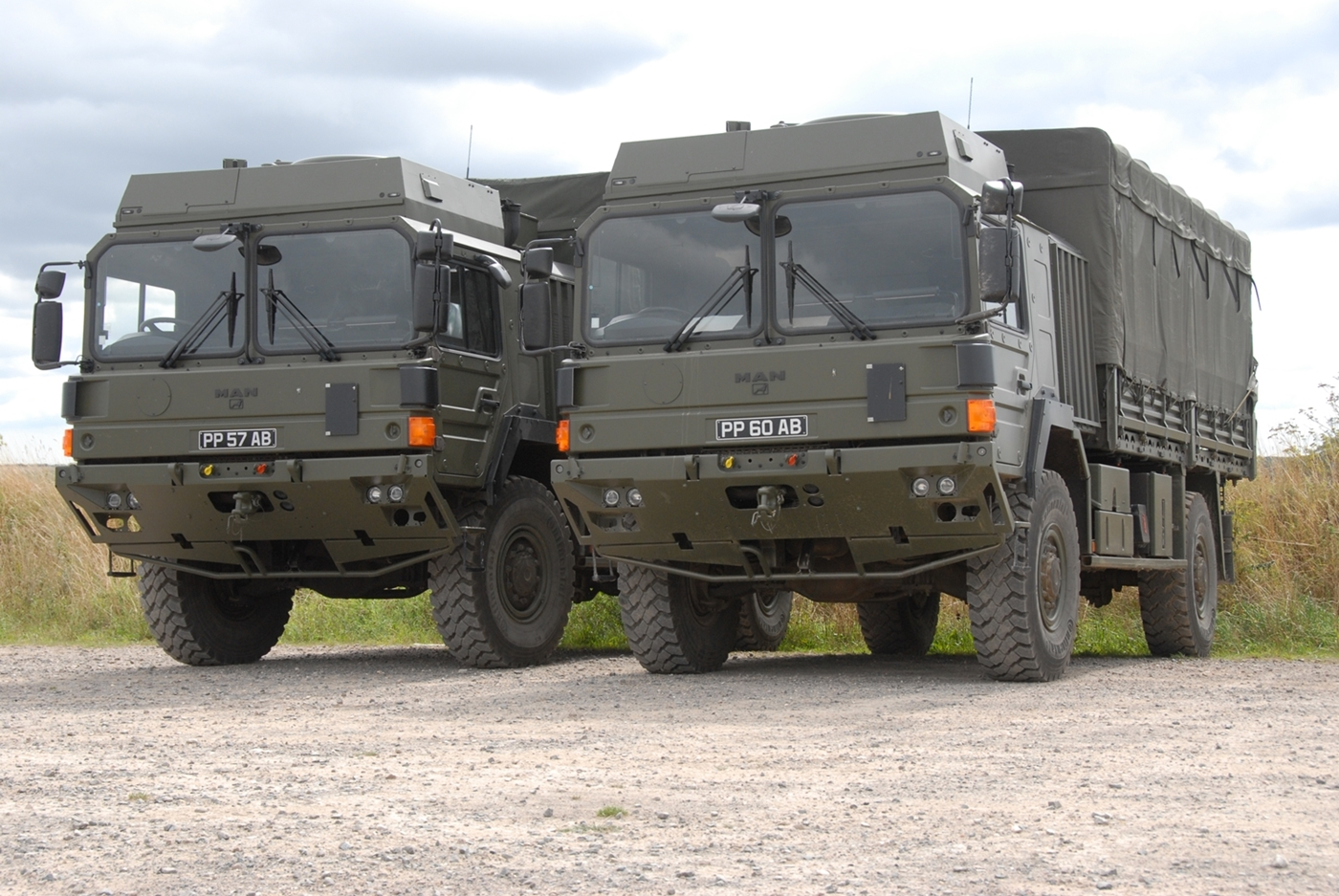
British Army HX60s; the HX family are a range of purpose-designed tactical military trucks

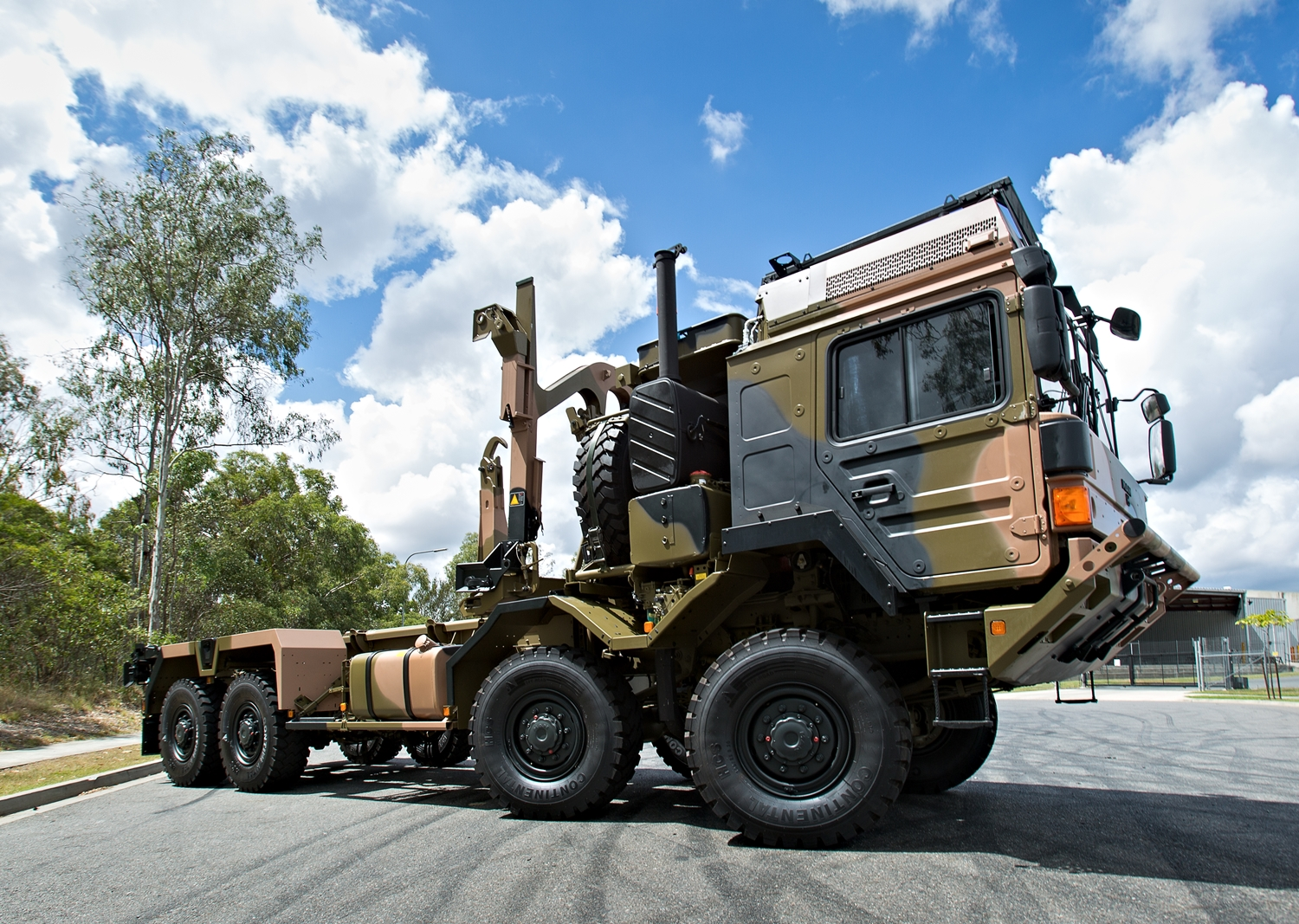
An HX77, one of the first LAND 121 vehicles to be handed over to the Australian Army in 2016

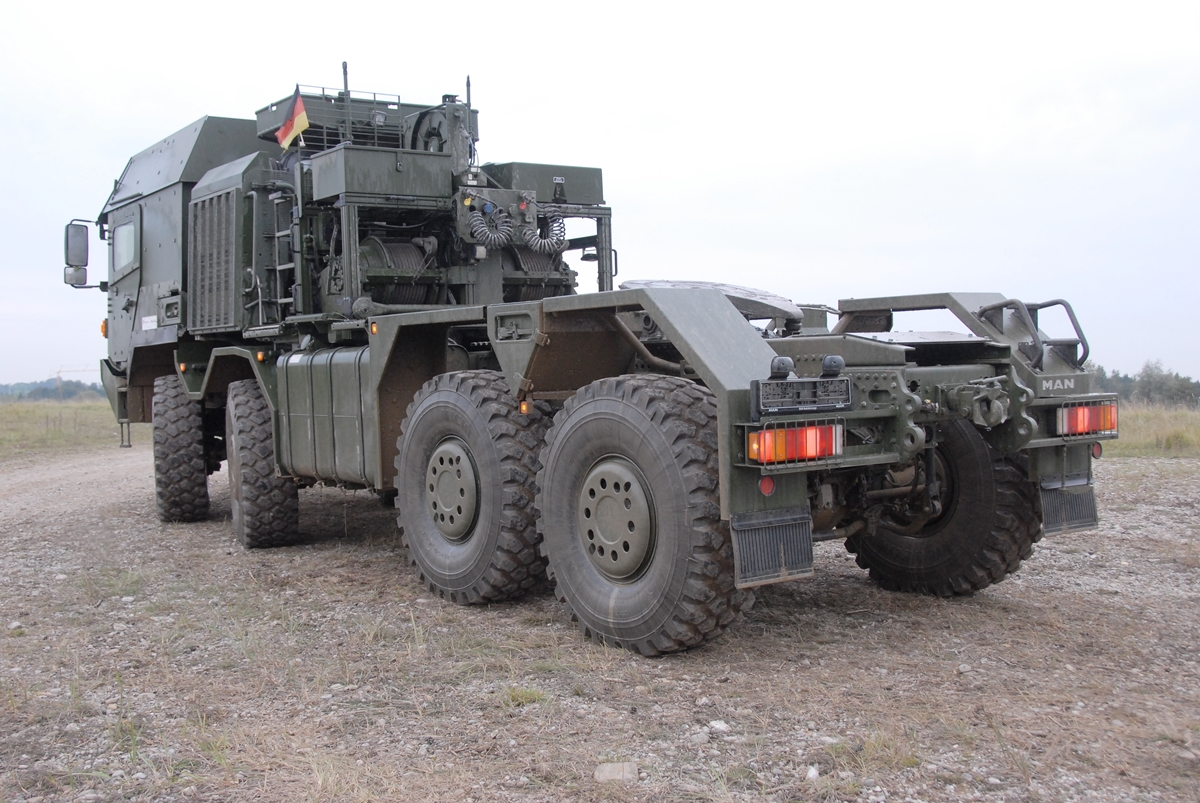
Rear three-quarter shot showing winch assembly of an HX81 tank transporter

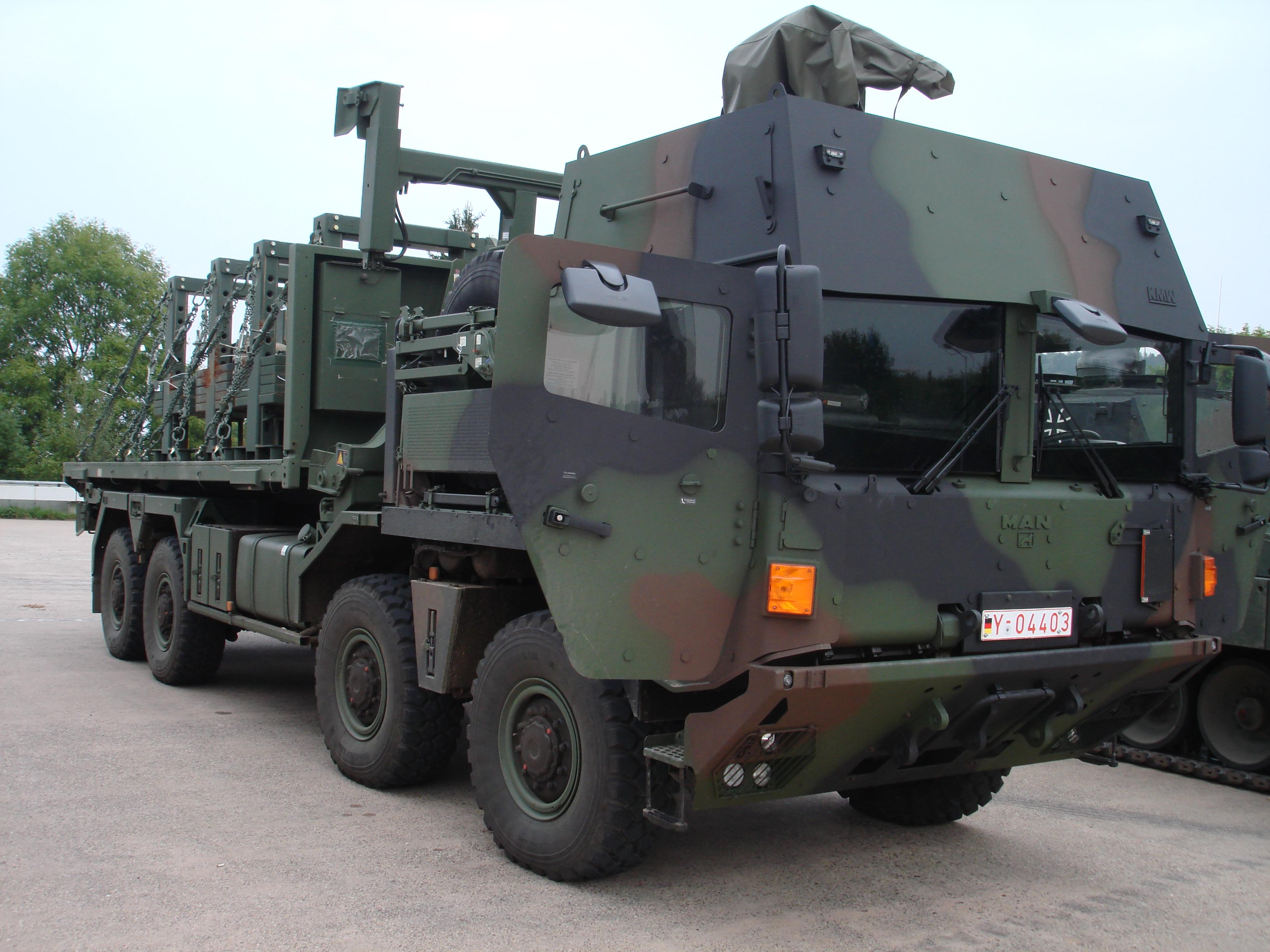
RMMV SX 32.440 Multi 2 IAC3/3 with Multilift load handling system and an armoured cab

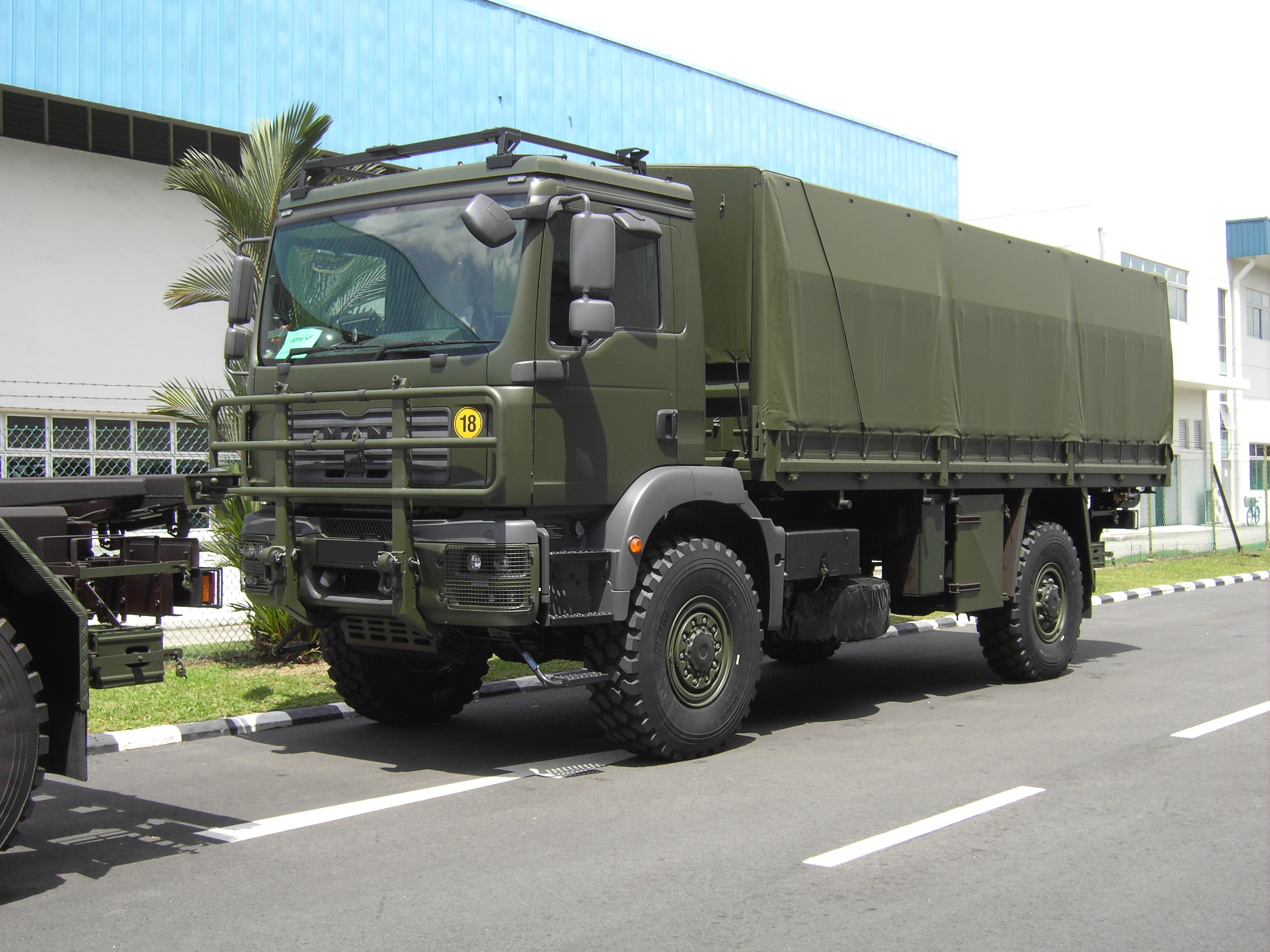
RMMV TG-MIL, a militarised MAN TGM (4x4) truck

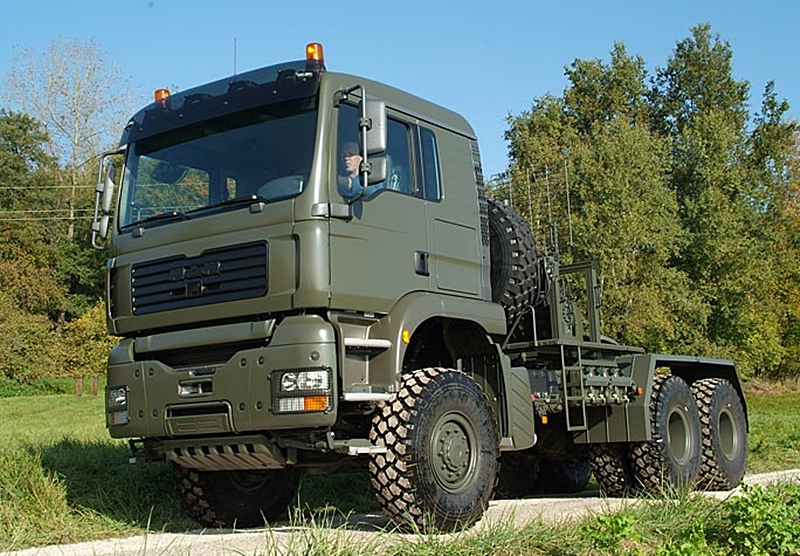
RMMV TG-MIL, a militarised MAN TGA 40.413 DFAS (6x6) truck

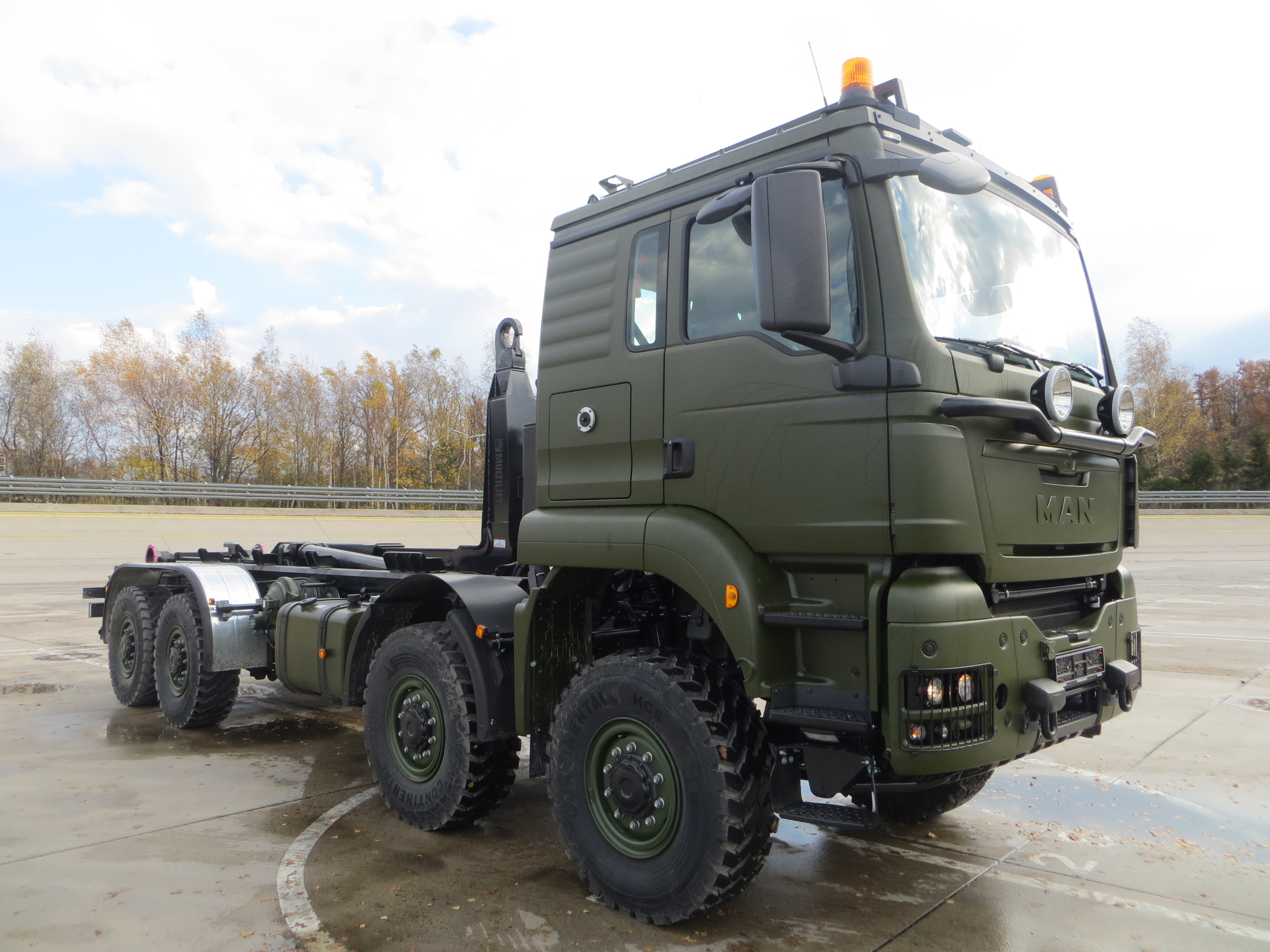
RMMV TG-MIL, a militarized MAN TGS (8x8), this example a Swedish Army trials vehicle

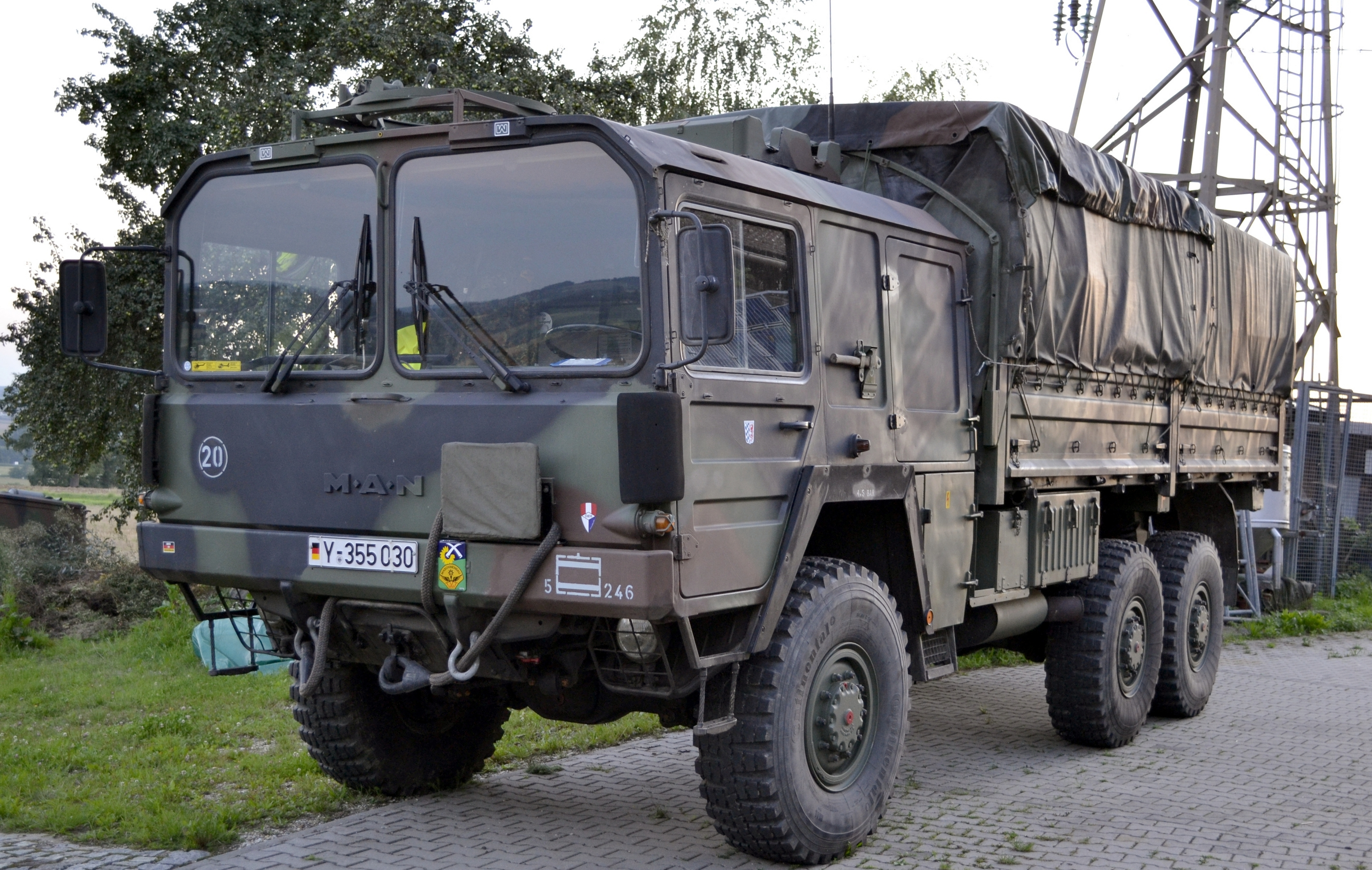
Category 1/Kat 1 Type 462/452 LKW 7t mil gl with optional winch (Legacy product)

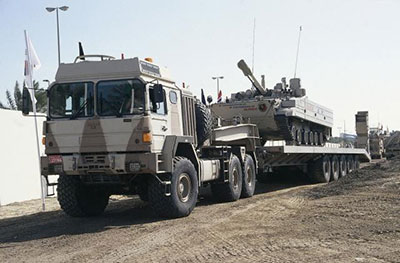
HX range heavy equipment transporter of UAE armed forces (Legacy product)

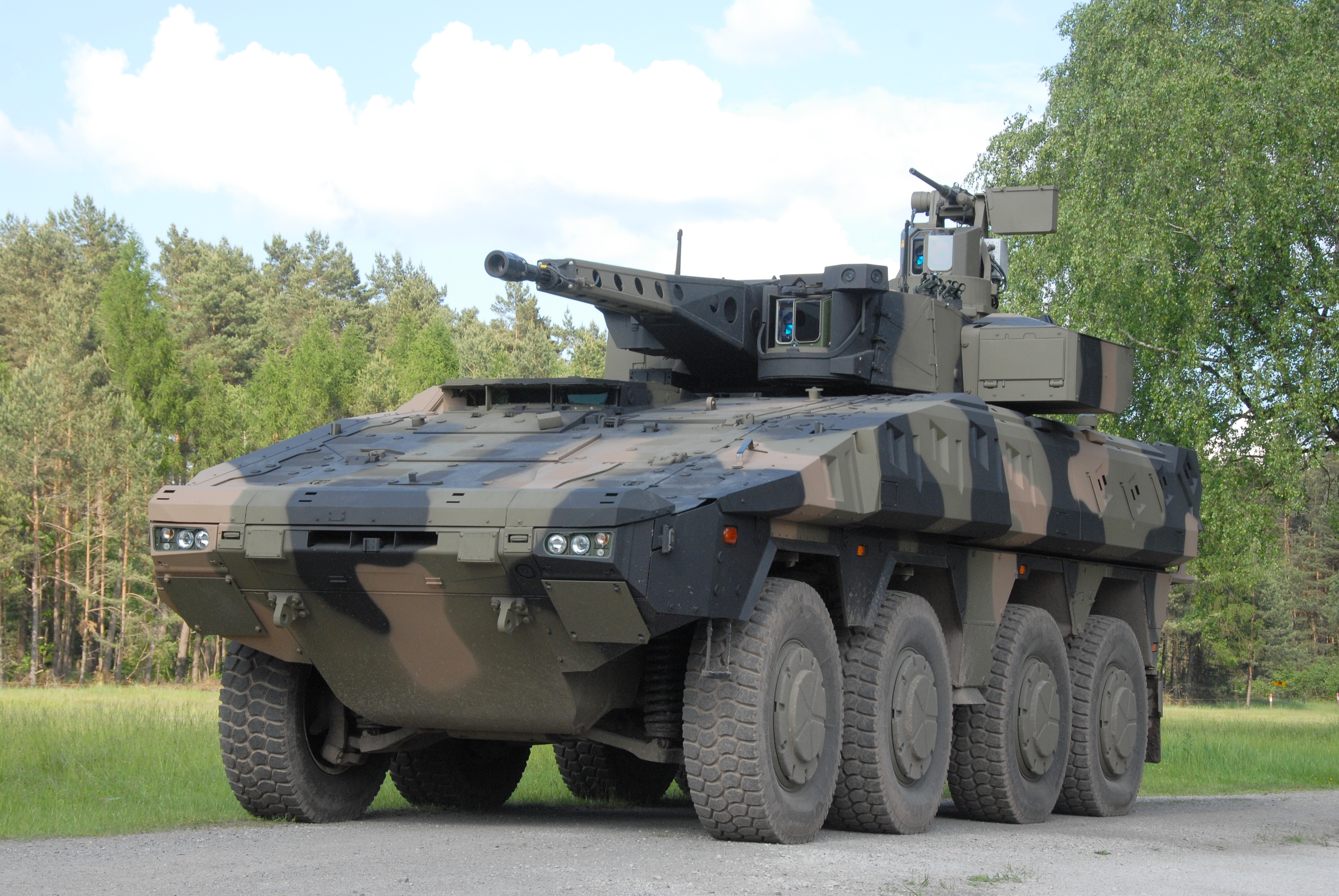
The Boxer which was developed jointly with KMW is an example of the armoured tactical vehicles that were part of the RMMV portfolio pre-2019

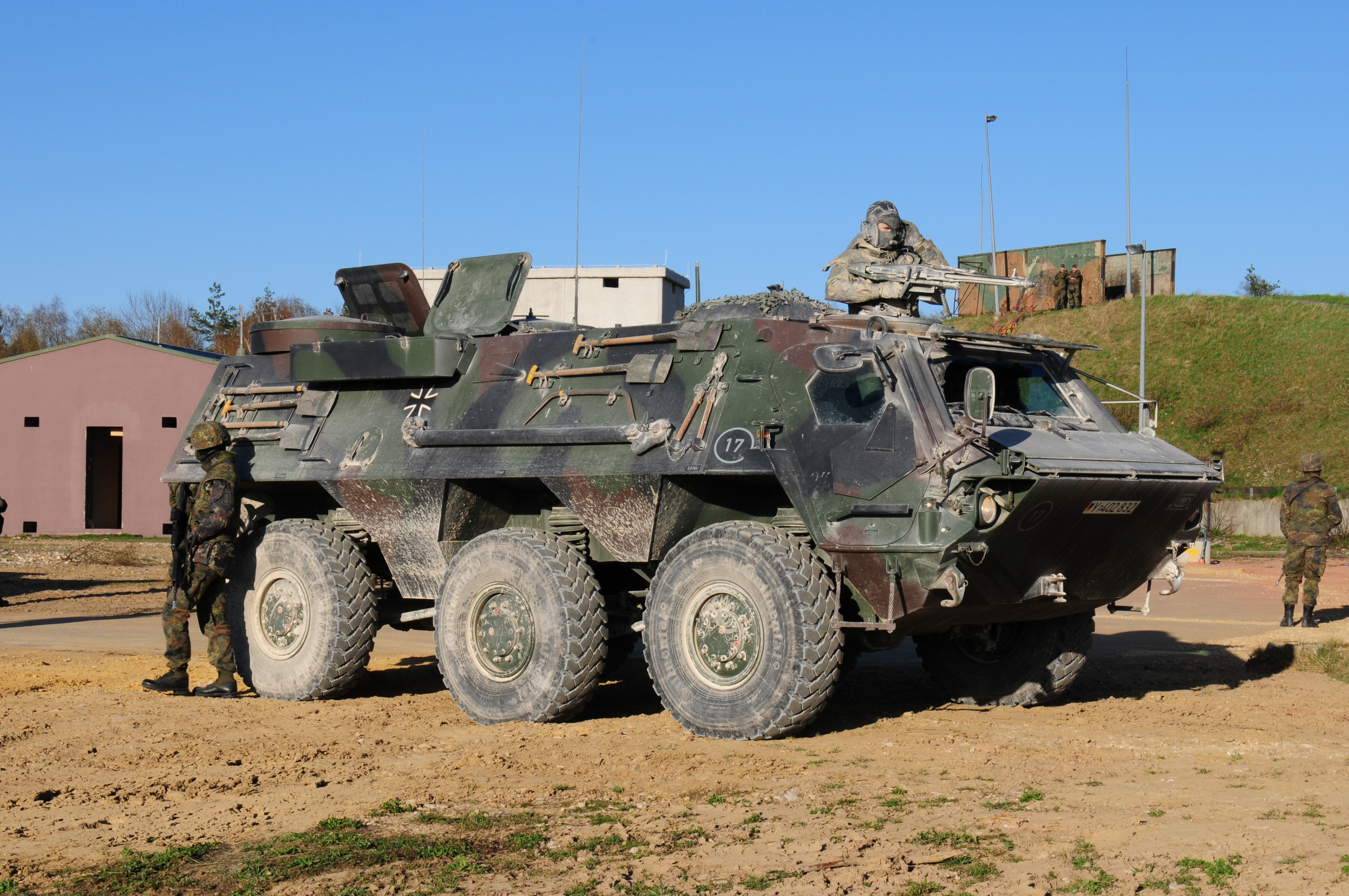
The TPz Fuchs ("Fox") is an APC originally developed by Daimler-Benz but manufactured and further developed by Rheinmetall, and is an example of the armoured tactical vehicles that were part of the RMMV portfolio pre-2019

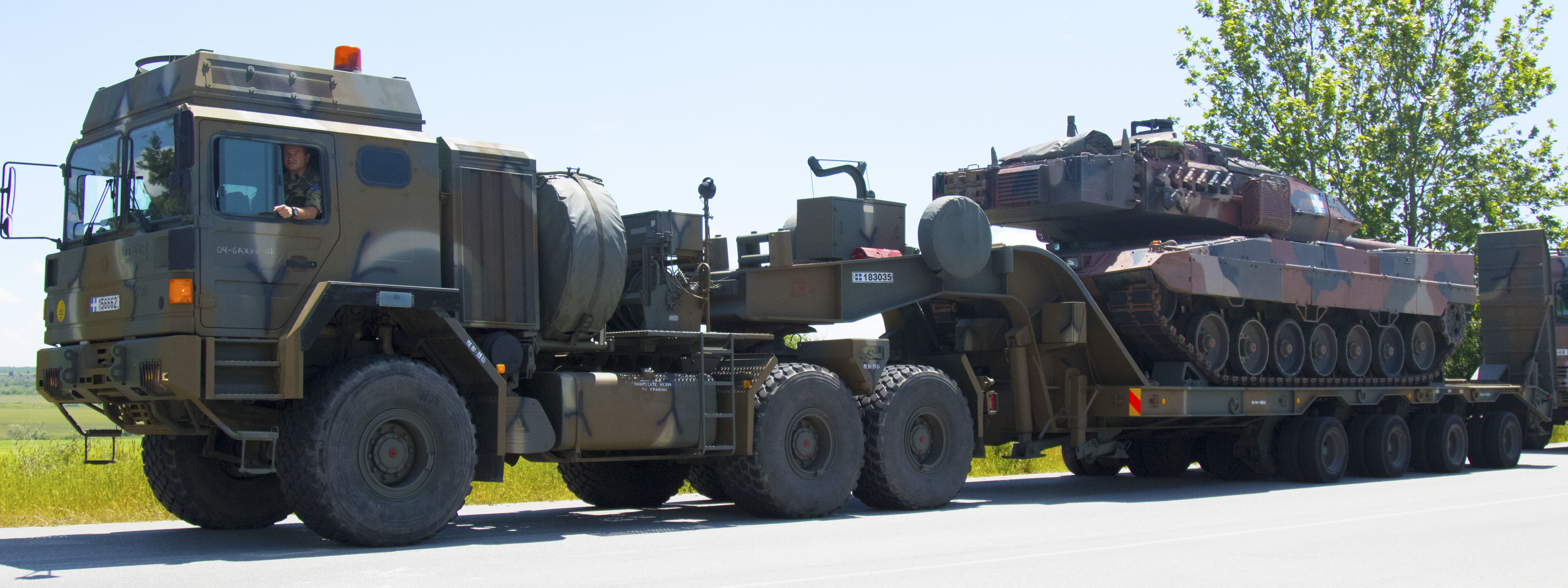
MAN 40.633 FX DFAETX

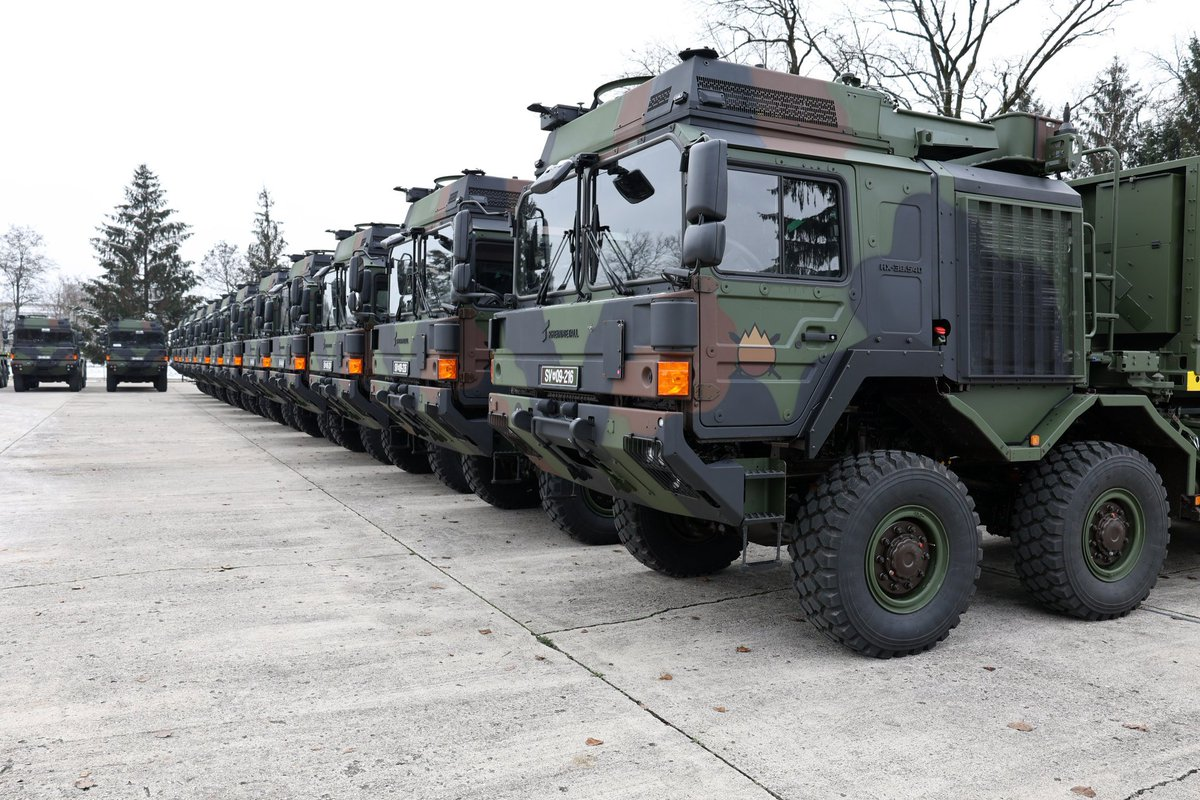
MAN HX 8×8 RMMV trucks Slovenian Army.
