= List of equipment of the Austrian Armed Forces =

This is a partial list of equipment currently used by the Austrian Armed Forces.

== Personal equipment ==
=== Clothing ===
| Model | Image | Origin | Pattern | Environment / colour scheme | Notes |
Camouflage
| Tarnanzug ÖBH | | Austria | Organic, non-pixelated pattern | Temperate environment | New standard camouflage to equip the whole force, selected in 2017, fielded since 2019. Colours of the camouflage: grey, dark olive, medium olive, lichen green, khaki, and sand. |
| Tarnanzug Beige ÖBH | | Austria | Organic, non-pixelated shapes | Arid / desert environment | New "standard" desert camouflage, to be used in cases of deployments in arid regions by the general troops. It has been supplied since 2022. Colours of the camouflage: black, grey, khaki and sand/tan. |
| RAL 7013 | | Austria | Single colour | Temperate environment / khaki | Former standard camouflage, being replaced by the Tarnanzug neu ÖBH. It is used with the Kampfanzug 03 combat uniform. |
| Tarndruck Beige PXL | | Austria | Digital pattern | Arid / desert environment | This pattern was presented in 2011 in parallel with a Central Europe variant of the same pattern. The desert / arid colour scheme variant was developed to replace the solid color sand/tan uniforms used until then by troops deployed in peace keeping missions in arid regions. It was observed in 2020, for international missions such as in Lebanon, with the UNIFIL troops. This pattern is being replaced by two patterns: the Tarnanzug Beige ÖBH as a standard pattern for peace keeping missions in arid regions; the MultiCam Arid™ to by used by the Austrian Special Forces (Jagdkommando) in arid regions |
| Tarndruck SEK PXL | | Austria | Digital pattern | Multi-environment | The Bundesheer was looking for new camouflage patterns for the special forces. A central Europe colour scheme was initially developed and a sand camouflage as well, both were presented in 2011. After an evaluation, a new variant was developed and presented in 2014. It combines both variants for a muli-environment result. It is considered as an Austrian digital MultiCam type of camouflage. This pattern is the same as the Tarndruck Beige PXL, and the colour scheme mixes those of the Tarndruck Central Europe and the Tarndruck Beige PXL. This pattern has been approved and implemented in the Jagdkommando. Later on, the decision was made to supplement it with the MultiCam™ pattern. |
| MultiCam™ | | United States | Woodland pattern | Multi-environment | Used by the Jagdkommando and in the past by soldiers deployed in Afghanistan. Initially used with CLAW GEAR combat uniform, and in 2022, a new combat uniform by CARINTHIA started to be used. |
| MultiCam Arid™ | – | United States | Woodland pattern | Arid / desert environment | Used by the Jagdkommando and observed for the first time in 2022 at SOFEX 2022. The combat uniform is supplied by CARINTHIA. |

=== Protection equipment ===
| Model | Image | Origin | Type | Notes |
Ballistic helmet
| SPECTRA helmet Kevlarhelme | | France | Combat helmet | Introduced in 1994, supplied by MSA Gallet. |
| Ops-Core Sentry XP Mid Cut Helmet; Kampfhelme 2015 | | United States | Combat helmet | Initial contract in 2016 for 20,000 helmets, which entered service from 2017, and progressively replace the SPECTRA helmet. Additional contract in May 2021 with Gentex Corp for 18,000 helmets for €14.1 million. |
CBRN Protection
| Dräger M2000 | – | Germany | CBRN respiratory mask | 40,800 masks |

=== Electronic equipment ===
| Model | Image | Origin | Type | In service | Notes |
|---|---|---|---|---|---|
| Theon night vision goggles | NSB-3D NYX AE night vision goggles from Theon | Greece | 3D night vision goggles | 4,000 | Ordered for €70.7 million. |

== Infantry weapons ==
| Model | Image | Origin | Type | Calibre | Notes |
Field Knives
| Glock knife | | Austria | Field Knife | – | |
Pistols
| Glock 17; P 80 | | Austria | Semi-automatic pistol | 9×19mm Parabellum | Standard-issue pistol, upgraded to Gen 3 standard between 2002 and 2003. |
| Glock 17 Gen 5 FDE | | Austria | Semi-automatic pistol | 9×19mm Parabellum | Generation 5 FDE variant in use with the Jagdkommando. |
| Glock 26; P26 | | Austria | Semi-automatic subcompact pistol | 9×19mm Parabellum | In use with the Jagdkommando. 300 purchased. |
| Glock 21 | | Austria | Semi-automatic pistol | .45 ACP | Primary weapon of the Kampfschwimmer (subset of the Jagdkommando). |
Submachine guns
| Glock 18C; P 18C | | Austria | Selective-fire pistol | 9×19mm Parabellum | In use with the Jagdkommando. |
| FN P90 | | Belgium | Personal defence weapon | FN 5.7×28mm NATO | In use with the Jagdkommando and military police. |
Assault rifles
| Steyr AUG A1 MOD; StG 77 A1 MOD | | Austria | Assault rifle | 5.56×45mm NATO | Standard issue assault rifle in service. 14'400 are being upgraded to the StG 77 A1 MOD standard.: A3 housing; Steyr 3x scope and top mounted Aimpoint T2 red dot; Rheinmetall TLLM tactical laser light module |
| Steyr AUG A1 MOD Nightfighter; StG 77 A1 MOD Nightfighter | – | Austria | Assault rifle | 5.56×45mm NATO | New rifles for the armed forces, 4,000 purchased, and deliveries starting in April 2025. Specifications: Aimpoint Micro T2 red-dot on top, and a triple magnification device below; Coating on the rifle less visible to night vision |
| Steyr AUG A1 MP; StG 77 A1 MP | – | Austria | Assault rifle | 5.56×45mm NATO | 600 StG 77 A1 MP procured. Variant used by the Austrian Military Police, adopted in 2018. Rifle equipped with: Picatinny rail top; Aimpoint Micro T1 red dot; Aimpoint 3×Mag-1 magnifier; Rheinmetall Vario Ray laser and light module mounted on the right side; Ase-Ultra flash hider |
| Steyr AUG A3 SF; StG 77 A2 Kommando | | Austria | Assault rifle | 5.56×45mm NATO | In use with the Jagdkommando and the Jägerbataillon 25. A2 Kommando rifles are equipped with various attachements such as grenade launchers, optics and suppressors. |
Machine guns
| Rheinmetall MG3; MG 74 | | West Germany; Austria | General-purpose machine gun | 7.62×51mm NATO | Standard issue infantry support general purpose machine gun. Also used as coaxial machine gun of the Leopard 2A4. |
| FN MAG; MG MAG | | Belgium | General-purpose machine gun | 7.62×51mm NATO | Vehicle mounted machine gun: coaxial machine gun with Ulan IFV; roof-mounted on Leopard 2A4.; side weapon with S-70 Blackhawk |
| M2 Browning; 12,7 mm üsMG M2 | | United States | Heavy machine gun | 12.7×99mm NATO | Standard use heavy machine guns and mounted on vehicles and helicopters. |
Sniper rifles
| Steyr SSG 69; SSG 69 P4 | | Austria | Bolt-action sniper rifle | 7.62×51mm NATO | Standard issue precision rifle. |
| Heckler & Koch HK417P lSSG HK417P (Ö) (leichtes Scharfschützengewehr) | | Germany | Designated marksman rifle | 7.62×51mm NATO | 72 HK417P purchased. In use with the Jagdkommando; Accessories: Kahles K624i telescopic sight; Safran Vectronix NiteSpotMR (residual light night vision attachment); Rheinmetall FCS-TacRay Ballistic (fire control system) |
| Steyr SSG 08A2 mSSG Steyr 08A2 (mittleres Scharfschützengewehr) | | Austria | Bolt-action sniper rifle | 8.6×70 mm (known as .338 Lapua Magnum) | 120 SSG 08A2 purchased. In use with the Jagdkommando. Rifles equipped with Kahles K624i telescopic sights. |
| Barrett M82A1 sSSG M82 A1 (Schweres Scharfschützenwaffensystem) | | United States | Bolt-action anti-materiel rifle | 12.7×99mm NATO | 102; Rifles equipped with Kahles K624i telescopic sights. |
Shotguns
| Remington Model 870 | | United States | Pump action shotgun | 12 gauge | In use with the Jagdkommando |
Ceremonial rifle
| FN FAL; StG 58 | | Belgium; Austria | Battle rifle | 7.62×51mm NATO | Former service rifle, now used as a ceremonial weapon by Austrian Guard Companies. |
Grenade launchers
| Madritsch Weapon Technology ML40 Mk2 | | Austria | Single grenade launcher | 40×46mm LV | Standard issue grenade launcher, equipped with Aimpoint Micro. |
| Madritsch Weapon Technology ML40 Mk2 | – | Austria | Under-barrel grenade launcher | 40×46mm LV | Used with the StG 77 A2 Kommando. |
| Steyr GL40 | | Austria | Grenade launcher | 40×46mm LV | Used with rubber weapons by the military police. |
Man-portable anti-tank systems
| RBS-56B Bill 2 PAL 2000 "Bill" | | Sweden | Anti-tank weapon | – | 339 launchers, and 2,000 missiles purchased in 1996. |
| Carl Gustaf M2; 8,4 cm PAR 66/79 | | Sweden | Recoilless rifle | – | |
Land mines
| ATM 2000E | – | Austria | Anti-tank Landmine | N/A | |
| Model 67 mine | – | Austria | Anti-tank Landmine | N/A | |
| ATM-6 and ATM-7 mines | – | Austria | Anti-tank Landmine | N/A | |

== Indirect Fire ==
| Model | Image | Origin | Type | Calibre | Quantity | Notes |
Mortars
| L16 81mm mortar 8,1cm mGrW 82 | | United Kingdom | Infantry mortar | 81 mm | – | |
| Hirtenberger M12-1111; 12 cm GrW 86 | | Austria | Heavy mortar | 120 mm | 85 | |
Artillery
| M109; PzHb M109 A5Ö | | United States; Austria | Self-propelled howitzer | 155 mm L/39 | 53 | |
| M109; Rechenstellenpanzer M109 | | United States; Austria | Command and artillery computing station | – | – | |

== Vehicles ==
=== Armoured vehicles ===
| Model | Image | Origin | Type | In service | Notes |
Armoured fighting vehicles
| Leopard 2A4; KPz Leopard | | West Germany | MBT; Main battle tank | 56 | 114 purchased in 1996 from the Netherlands as part of the "Mech-Paket" in a broader effort to modernise all mechanised units. They entered service in 1997. In 2006, the number of active tanks was reduced to 40, two tank batallions. In 2011, 40 tanks were sold to KMW. In 2017, the decision was made to reactivate a new tank battalion to reach a total of 56 tanks. In 2023, the decision was made to upgrade existing fleet to the Leopard 2NV standard, with a total of 58 tanks to be upgraded. In 2026, first upgraded tanks entered service. |
| ASCOD; SPZ Ulan | | Austria; Spain | IFV; Infantry fighting vehicle | 112 | 112 IFV ordered in 1999, it entered service in 2002. Turret Steyr SP30 equipped with a Mauser MK 30/2 autocanon (30×173 mm) and a FN MAG coaxial machine gun. Modernisation decided in 2023: Replacement of optics and electronic components of the fire control system; Overhaul of the drivetrain; New air conditioning system; Mounts for the SAAB Barracuda camouflage; In 2026, first upgraded vehicles entered service. |
Armoured vehicles multi-role
| Pandur I (A3); Mannschafts Transportpanzer Pandur A3 (MTPz) | | Austria | APC; Armoured personnel carrier | 68 | 68 Pandur ordered in the 1990s, and it entered service in 1996. Equipment: Manned weapon station equipped with M2 Browning; First modernisation MTPz A1/UN 2004.; mine protection seats; new telecommunications equipment; new cabling for the central electrical system; new heater; Second modernisation MTPz A2, 2010.; ELSAIT EFWS WS4 Panther RCWS; rear-view camera; camouflage nets; Third modernisation MTPz A3, 2017.; Upgraded ballistic protection with RUAG SidePRO-KE; Additional mine protection with RUAG MinePRO; Mechanical improvements |
| Pandur Evolution; Mannschafts Transportpanzer Pandur Evo (MTPz Pandur Evo) | | Austria | APC; Armoured personnel carrier | 64 (+36 on order) | Vehicle made by GDELS Steyr, it entered service in 2019. Crew of 3 (driver, gunner, commander) and 8 seats for a fighter group. Main equipment: ELSAIT EFWS WS4 Panther RCWS; Saab Barracuda camo; Orders: 34 ordered in December 2016 (€105 million); 30 ordered in January 2021 (€106 million); 36 ordered in September 2022, to be delivered by the end of 2025. |
| BvS10 MkIIB AUT; Universal Geländefahhrzeug BVS10 Hägglunds | | Sweden | Tracked articulated vehicle | 32 | 32 purchased in 2016 for €85 million, entering service in 2018. Equipment and specifications: ESLAIT EFWS WS4 Panther RCWS; "Combat NG" battlefield management system; Improved mine protection; 360° observation system |
| ATF Dingo 2 A1 PatSi; Allschutzfahrzeug Dingo 2 | | Germany | Infantry mobility vehicle | 20 | 20 ordered in October 2004, it entered service in 2005. Equipment: KMW 1530 RCWS with a Rheinmetall MG3 (MG 74) |
| ATF Dingo 2 A3 PatSi; Allschutzfahrzeug Dingo 2 | | Germany | Infantry mobility vehicle | 46 | Purchases: 14 ordered in April 2016; 32 ordered in March 2017, deliveries in 2017 - 2018; Equipment: ESLAIT EFWS WS4 Panther RCWS; IR headlight |
| Iveco LMV; Geschütztes Mehrzweckfahrzeug Husar / Husar MP (GMF Husar) | | Italy | Infantry mobility vehicle / military police | 123 | 150 Iveco LMV purchased, 27 in specialised variants (see below). It entered service in 2008. Equipment: ESLAIT EFWS WS4 Panther RCWS; Mine and NBC protection; Rear view camera; Radar absorbing paint |
| Iveco LMV; Geschütztes Mehrzweckfahrzeug Husar PsyOps (GMF Husar PsyOps) | | Italy | Psychological operation | 3 | Part of the military police mission. Equipment: ESLAIT EFWS WS4 Panther RCWS; Loudspeaker LRAD-500X; Mine and NBC protection; Rear view camera; Radar absorbing paint |
Observation and reconnaissance
| Iveco LMV; BAA-EO Geschütztes Mehrzweckfahrzeug Husar (BAA-EO GMF Husar) | – | Italy | Observation and reconnaissance vehicle | 22 | 22 ordered in November 2013. It entered service in 2017. 12 for reconnaissance companies, 6 for artillery observation teams, 4 for the Jagdkommando. Equipment: ESLAIT EFWS WS4 Panther RCWS; Mine and NBC protection; Rear view camera; Radar absorbing paint; Mast integrated at the back with: Dual camera (day / IR), laser range finder, laser guidance; Multi Threat Detection System (Radar and laser detecting sensors); GPS and INS |
| Iveco LMV; Geschütztes Mehrzweckfahrzeug Husar Beagle (GMF Husar Beagle) | | Italy; Israel | Ground surveillance radar | 2 | The Husar Beagle entered service in 2021. Equipment: PPE PGSR-3i Beagle by Pro Patria Electronics; ESLAIT EFWS WS4 Panther RCWS |
Armoured ambulances
| ATF Dingo 2 Allschutzfahrzeug Dingo 2 | | Germany | Armoured ambulance | 9 | Entered service in 2005.: 3 ordered in 2005; 6 ordered in 2013 |
| Pandur I (A3); Mannschafts Transportpanzer Pandur A3 (MTPz) | | Austria | Armoured ambulance | 3 | Ambulance purchased for €3.8 million and entered service in 2003. |
NBC vehicles
| ATF Dingo 2 AC-Aufklärungsfahrzeug Dingo 2 | | Germany | NBC reconnaissance vehicle | 12 | NBC reconnaissance ordered in 2005 |
Logistics
| MAN HX77 8×8; Hakenladesystem MAN 38.440 8×8 | | Austria; Germany | Armoured trucks with hook loading system | 24 | RMMV HX2 38.440 purchased in 2009. Equipment: Palfinger PALIFT Scorpion |
Armoured recovery vehicles
| M-88 A1; Bergepanzer M-88 A1 | | United States | ARV; Armoured recovery vehicle | 10 | |
| Sk-105 - Bpz Greif A1; Bergepanzer "Greif" A1 | | Austria | ARV; Armoured recovery vehicle | 24 | |
| MAN HX2 8×8; Schweres geschütztes Bergefahrzeug HX2 (sBgeFzg) | (Illustration of similar system) | Austria | Heavy wrecker | 3 | Wrecker based on the RMMV HX2 41.545 that entered service in 2019. The crew is made of a commander, driver and rescue assistant. Equipment: Lift arm, maximum load of 160 kN; Winches; Main: 270 kN, 80 meters; Frame winch: 120 kN, 60 meters; Small winch: 10 kN, 250 m; Loading crane: HIAB 2222 ATF 2 (205 kNm capacity) |
Engineering and support vehicles
| Sk-105 PiPz; Leichte Pionierpanzer | | Austria | AEV; Armoured engineering vehicle | 18 | |
| Hydrema 910MCV-2 | | Denmark | Mine clearing vehicle | 2 | |
| DOK-ING MV4 Scorpion | | Croatia | Remote controlled mine clearing vehicle | 4 | |
| DOK-ING MV10 Bison | | Croatia | Remote controlled mine clearing vehicle | 1 | |
| Liebherr PR 726 G8 | (illustration, uses military camouflage) | Germany; Switzerland | Armoured bulldozer | 2 | Remote controlled capable bulldozer. |
| Steyr 6300 Terrus CVT; Splittergeschützte Traktoren | (illustration) | Austria | Armoured tractor | 9 | Armoured cabin by Achtleiner, used at the Allentsteig military training area. STANAG 4569 Level 3 protection. |
Armoured training vehicle
| ASCOD; SPz Ulan Fahrschulausführung | | Austria; Spain | Driver training vehicle | Unknown | |
Reserve
| Leopard 2A4; KPz Leopard | | West Germany | MBT; Main battle tank | 16 | 114 purchased, 40 sold to KMW, 58 to be modernised in total, 16 remain in reserve. |
| Pandur I | | Austria; Belgium | APC; Armoured personnel carrier | 6 | Purchased second-hand to the Belgian Army in 2016, and used for spare parts. |
| Pandur I | | Austria; Belgium | Armoured ambulance | 1 | Purchased second-hand to the Belgian Army in 2016, and used for spare parts. |

=== Unarmoured vehicles ===
| Model | Image | Origin | Type | In service | Notes |
Utility vehicles
| Pinzgauer 710 M (4×4 and 6×6) | | Austria | Combat vehicle for motorized reconnaissance troops | 900 | Combat vehicle for motorised reconnaissance troops (Jägerbataillon 12). To be replaced by Iveco MUV M70.20. |
| Pinzgauer 716 M (4×4) | | Austria | Off-road transport | 900 | Used as a combat vehicle for a group with their equipment and transport vehicle for material and equipment up to 1.5t. To be replaced by Iveco MUV M70.20. |
| Puch G-Class W461; PUCH / G300 diesel, 0.8 t | | Austria; West Germany | Multi-role utility vehicle | – | Chassis: 461.312; 461.313; Variants: A (KF, short, solid roof); B (LF, long, solid roof); C (KP, short, tarpaulin cover); D (LP, long tarpaulin cover); E (LF-FM, long, solid roof, communications) |
| Iveco MUV M70.20 4×4; Iveco Noriker Führungsunterstützung (Iveco Noriker FüU) | | Italy; Austria | Command and support | 70 | Successor of the 900 Pinzgauer. Vehicle to be supplied by Iveco, and the mission modules by EMPL. Orders: 125 vehicles for €42.5 million ordered in 2023, delivery 2024 - 2026; 70 Command and support systems; 55 radio links vehicles |
| Iveco MUV M70.20 4×4; IDV MUV Richtfunk | | Italy; Austria | Radio links | 55 | Successor of the 900 Pinzgauer. Vehicle to be supplied by Iveco, and the mission modules by EMPL. Orders: 125 vehicles for €42.5 million ordered in 2023, delivery 2024 - 2026; 70 Command and support systems; 55 radio links vehicles |
| Mitsubishi L200 (4th generation); Mitsubishi L 200 2,5 DK DI-D 2.5 Work Edition with Road Ranger cargo area cover | | Japan | Multi-role utility vehicle | 300 | 300 ordered in 2014. |
| Mitsubishi L200 (5th generation); L200 DK DI-D 2,2 4WD Auto, Work Edition with Road Ranger cargo area cover | (Illustration of model) | Japan | Multi-role utility vehicle | 325 | 245 with a bed cover to be delivered by the end of 2024, and 80 for driver training without bed cover. 302 delivered in 2023 |
| Nissan Pathfinder (gen 3) | (Illustration) | Japan | Liaison, exploration, reconnaissance, utility, patrol and training vehicle | – | Also used by the Austrian Army for patrols in Kosovo with the KFOR. |
| VW Touareg (R5 TDI) | | Germany | Liaison, exploration, reconnaissance, utility, patrol and training vehicle | 102 | Ordered in 2008. Also used by the Austrian Army for patrols in Kosovo with the KFOR. |
| Skoda Kodiaq | | Czech Republic; Germany | Patrol and military police vehicle | – | |
| VW T6; VW T6 Nutzfahrzeug | | Germany | Utility vehicles and military police | 280 | |
| VW T6; Pritsche Doppelkabine | | Germany | Flatbed utility vehicle | 40 | Received in 2023. |
| VW Golf 7 Variant | | Germany | Utility vehicles and military police | 80 | Received in 2023. |
| VW ID.3 | (Illustration of model) | Germany | Civilian use vehicles | 30 | 30 received in 2021. |
| VW ID.4 | (Illustration of model) | Germany | Civilian use vehicles | 25 | 25 Received in 2023. |
Special forces vehicles
| Achtleiner Toyota Land Cruiser 200 | | Austria; Japan | Civilian special forces vehicle | – | Operated by the Jagdkommando. |
| PUCH G 290/LP; Sandviper | | Austria; Germany | Light tactical vehicle | – | Operated by the Jagdkommando. Equipment: Version I: 2 × MG 74 (MG3); Version II: 1 × MG 74 (MG3) and 1 × 12,7 mm üsMG M2 (M2 Browning) |
| Defenture GRF | | Netherlands | Light tactical vehicle | – | New light tactical and air-loadable mobile platform for the Jagdkommando ordered in April 2024. Successor of the "Sandviper", first deliveries in 2024. |
Logistics
| MAN HX81 8×8 | | Austria; Germany | Tank transporter | 17 (1 on order) | 70 tons capacity.: 3 received in 2021 with 7-axle low-bed semi-trailers from Doll; 15 ordered in 2023 with 8-axles low-bed semi-trailers from EMPL, contract estimated at €36 million,14 delivered by July 2025, last delivered by the end of 2025 |
| RMMV TGM MIL 8×6 | | Austria; Germany | Truck with hook loading system | 72 | RMMV TGM 38.440 purchased in 2009. Equipment: Palfinger PALIFT Scorpion |
| mContTA 10 m³ | – | | Fuel tank | 20 | 10,000 liters of roll-on containers purchased in 2016. |
Recovery vehicle
| MAN HX2 6×6 mittleres Bergefahrzeug HX2 (mBgeFzg) | | Austria; Germany | Medium wrecker | 24 | Wrecker based on the RMMV HX42M 28.445 that entered service in 2022. Equipment: 48 t 4-axle trailer; 2 Sepson winches, 120 kN, 60 meters; Palfinger 41002 EH loading crane with a 36 mt capacity, 3.8 t maximum load and 9.5 m radius. |
| MAN HX2 6×6 leicht Bergefahrzeug HX2 (lBgeFzg) | | Austria; Germany | Recovery vehicle | 71 | Wrecker based on the RMMV HX42M 28.445 that entered service in 2022. Can be used for recovering broken down vehicles, transporting goods and transporting an ISO 10-foot container. It can recover vehicles up to 7.5 tons. with a Sepson winch (120 kN capacity, 60 meters cable). |
| EMPL Tieflader Quattro | | Austria; Germany | Low-loader trailer | 35 | 48 t capacity, telescopic 4-axle low-loading trailer, equipped with DOLL Quattro hybrid steering and a turntable, combined with hydraulic forced steering. It entered service in 2022. |
Ambulances
| Pinzgauer 712 AMB-S (6×6); Sanitätskraftwagen mit portablem Shelter (SanKw) | | Austria | Off-road medical vehicle | – | |
| VW T6 4-Motion (left); Krankentransportwägen | | Germany | Ambulance transport vehicle | 20 | Introduced in 2021. |
| VW Crafter 4-Motion (right); Notarztwägen | Germany | Ambulance transport vehicle | 20 | Introduced in 2022. | |
Firefighting
| MAN TGM 18.340 4×4; Universallöschfahrzeuge für Flugplatz, 3000 / 400 / 250 (ULFzg 3000 / 400 / 250) | | Austria; Germany | Airport fire engine | 6 | 3,000 litres water; 400 litres foaming agent; 250 kg of fire extinguishing powder |
| Rosenbauer / MAN TGM 18.320 4×4; ABC-Löschfahrzeug | | Austria; Germany | NBC fire engine | 10 | In service since 2016. Equipment: RS14 generator |
| EMPL Geländegängige Löschwasserversorgung | | Austria | Military firefighting container | – | Container with 13.5 m^{3} of water, a roof water canon, a hydrofighter Tornado II portable pump. Transported on RMMV SX45 truck equipped with a Palfinger Scorpion T17 hook loading system. |
| EMPL Löschcontainer | | Austria | Military firefighting equipment container | 3 | Container with firefighting equipment: power generators; 200 liter foam tank; 4,000 liter built-in diesel powered pump; pressure hoses; distributors; hollow jet pipes; pressure hoses; hand-held spotlights; thermal imaging cameras; breathing apparatus; medical backpacks; a chainsaw.; Transported on RMMV TGM 38.440 truck equipped with a Palfinger Scorpion T17 hook loading system. |
| DOK-ING MV-5 | | Croatia | Radio controlled fire extinguishing robot | 2 | Comes with tools such as a rotary gripper. |
| Pinzgauer 712 (6×6); Rette- und Bergefahrzeug Pinzgauer 712 (RuB Pinzgauer) | | Austria | Rescue vehicle | 18 | |
NBC decontamination
| RMMV TGS MIL 8×8 MAMMUT; Dekontaminationssystem MAMMUT | | Germany | Truck for NBC decontamination | 8 | Replacement of the ÖAF S-LKW based on the TEP 90 system by Rheinmetall. Based on MAN TGS 38.480, equipped with a crane (33 mt Palfinger PK 33002 EH) and MAMMUT module. |
| RMMV HX2 8×8 MAMMUT; Dekontaminationssystem MAMMUT | (Illustration of the base vehicle) | Germany | Truck for NBC decontamination | 2 | Replacement of the ÖAF S-LKW based on the TEP 90 system by Rheinmetall. Based on RMMV HX2 41.545, equipped with a crane (33 mt Palfinger PK 33002 EH) and MAMMUT module. |
| MAMMUT Decontamination module Dekontaminationssystem MAMMUT | | Germany | NBC decontamination module | 10 | Equipment: 33-meter-tonne Palfinger PK 33002 EHcrane; Module 1: vehicle decontamination with collecting basin; Module 2: vacuum chamber for dry decontamination of electronic equipment; Module 3: people decontamination (inflatable dress-up tent) |

=== Very light vehicles ===
| Model | Image | Origin | Type | In service | Notes |
Special forces light vehicles
| Polaris DAGOR; Deployable Advanced Ground Off-road | | United States | Ultra Light Combat Vehicle | – | Jagdkommando vehicle. |
| Polaris MRZR; Deployable Advanced Ground Off-road | | United States | Ultra Light Combat Vehicle | – | Jagdkommando vehicle. Variants: D2 (2 seats); D4 (4 seats) |
| Polaris Sportsman 570 6×6 Big Boss | | United States | ATV; All-terrain vehicle | – | Jagdkommando vehicle. |
Utility vehicles
| Polaris Sportsman XP 1000 | | United States | ATV; All-terrain vehicle | 38 | Purchased in 2016. |
| Arctic Cat 700D | | United States | ATV with rubber tracks All-terrain vehicle | – | Used by the mountain troops for mud and snow conditions as a utility vehicle. |
| Yamaha 700 Grizzly | (Illustration) | Japan | ATV with rubber tracks All-terrain vehicle | – | Used by the mountain troops for mud and snow conditions as a utility vehicle. |
Motorcycles
| KTM 250 | – | Austria | Enduro off-road motorcycle | – | |
| KTM 450 SX-F | | Austria | Enduro off-road motorcycle | – | KTM 450 equipped with Acerbis plastic kit, used by the Jagdkommando. |
| Kawasaki Versys 650 ABS | | Japan | Police motorcycle | – | Operated by the military police. |

=== Engineering machines and equipment ===
| Model | Image | Origin | Type | In service | Notes |
Cranes
| Liebherr LTM1070-4.2 | (Illustration, Austrian version in military camo) | Germany; Switzerland | Mobile crane | 1 | |
Logistics / handling systems
| HERBST-SMAG Orion V | | Germany | Reach stacker | 2 | Capacity of 24 tons, can stack up 3 containers height. |
| Caterpillar TH514D | – | United States | Telescopic handler | 25 | |
| Manitou MLT 627TC | – | France | Telescopic handler | – | |
| Manitou MRT 2150 | | France | Telescopic handler | – | |
| Palfinger Crayler FLG140 | – | Germany; Austria | Remote controlled field forklift on tracks | – | |
Military bridges
| Bailey Bridge | | United Kingdom | Temporary modular truss bridge | – | |
| Krupp-MAN D-Bridge | | West Germany | Temporary modular truss bridge | – | |
| Pionierbrücke 2000 | | Germany | Temporary modular beam bridge | – | Up to 40 meters span. |
| GDELS MAMBA | – | Germany | Ultra lightweight footbridge | 4 | |
Road reinforcement
| Faltstraßengerät; Faltstraßengerät | | Germany; Netherlands | Folding road | – | |
Excavators
| JCB JS200 LC Mono | – | United Kingdom | Tracked excavator | – | |
| JCB 8040 ZTS | | United Kingdom | Tracked excavator | – | |
| Komatsu PS 138-US | – | Japan | Tracked excavator | – | |
| Samsung SE 210-2 | | South Korea | Tracked excavator | – | |
| Takeuchi TB216 | – | Japan | Tracked excavator | – | |
| Volvo EC27C | – | Sweden | Tracked excavator | – | |
| Volvo ECR 88D | – | Sweden | Tracked excavator | – | |
| Volvo EC180BLC | – | Sweden | Wheeled excavator | – | |
| Kaiser SX | | Liechtenstein | Walking excavator | – | |
| Menzi Muck | – | Switzerland | Walking excavator | – | |
Backhoe loader
| JCB 4CX Sitemaster | | United Kingdom | Backhoe loader | 9 | Purchased in 2010 for €1.3 million. |
Loaders
| JCB 437 HT | (Illustration, Austrian version in military camo) | United Kingdom | Wheel loader | – | Some received in 2016; 4 received in 2020 |
| PAUS TSL 855 | – | Germany | Wheel loader | – | |
| Komatsu SK820-5 | | Japan | Wheeled skid-steer loader | – | |
Other construction machines
| Messersi TCH 2500 | – | Italy | Tracked dumper | – | |
| PAUS SMK 163 | – | Germany | Dumper | – | |
| Volvo G930 | – | Sweden | Grader | – | |
| Faun-Frisch F 155 A | – | Germany | Grader | – | |
Tractors
| Steyr 4145 Profi CVT; Splittergeschützte Traktoren | (Illustration) | Austria; Italy; United States | Tractor | 4 | Steyr SZ 50 front loader; Snow plow; Snow blower; Self-loading spreader; Boom mower |

== Electronic equipment ==
| Model | Image | Origin | Type | In service | Notes |
Communication equipment
| Iveco MUV M70.20 4×4; IDV MUV Richtfunk | | Italy; Austria | Radio links | 55 | Successor of the 900 Pinzgauer. Vehicle to be supplied by Iveco, and the mission modules by EMPL. Orders: 55 radio links vehicles |
| Tactical Communication Network | – | Austria; Finland | Digital communication system | 388 | 388 TCN procured, first delivery in March 2024. Supplied by Cancom Austria with a Bittium software. |
| Thales Schweiz TRC 4000 | (similar system) | Switzerland | Directional radio relay antenna | – | |
| Radio Access Point | – | – | – | – | |
| Thales SquadNet | – | United Kingdom | Tactical radio (very short distance) | 2,500 | |
| Ascom Pentacom RT405; TFF-41-0 | – | Switzerland | Handheld radio | – | |
| Tadiran PRC 2200 (5, 10 or 20 watts); TFF-1-0 | – | Israel | Shortwave vehicle radio (medium and long range) | – | Backpack and vehicles. |
| Tadiran PRC 2200 (125, 400 or 1,000 Watt); MFF-1A-0 | – | Israel | Shortwave portable radio (medium and long range) | – | Backpack and vehicles. |
| Funkgerätesatz BFF-32-0 | – | – | – | – | |
Command and control systems
| Iveco MUV M70.20 4×4; Iveco Noriker Führungsunterstützung (Iveco Noriker FüU) | | Italy; Austria | Command and support | 70 | Successor of the 900 Pinzgauer. Vehicle to be supplied by Iveco, and the mission modules by EMPL. Orders: 70 Command and support systems |
| Systematic Defence SitaWare Headquarters | | Denmark | Advanced command-and-control (software licences) | 500 | |
| Systematic Defence SitaWare Frontline | | Denmark | Mounted command and control system (software licences) | 1,000 | |
Ground reconnaissance
| PPE PGSR-3i Beagle | | Israel | Portable ground surveillance radar | 10 | |

== Air defence ==
| Model | Image | Origin | Type | In service | Notes |
Air surveillance radars
| Selex RAT-31DL; Fixed air defence radar (FADR) | | Italy | Long-range air surveillance radar | 3 | 1 radar ordered in 2002 to replace RAT-31S 2002, 2 additional ordered in 2006. Stationary radars, upgraded by Leonardo in 2020. |
| Selex RAT-31DL/M; Deployable air defence radar (DADR) | | Italy | Long-range air surveillance radar | 1 | 1 radar ordered in 2014 with an option for an additional radar. Mobile radar, upgrade by Leonardo in 2020. |
Air defence
| RAC 3D | | France | Target acquisition radar | 12 | Supplied by Thomson-CSF (Thales Group). |
| Mistral lFAL Mistral | | France | MANPAD, surface-to-air missile | 59 | Originally equipped with Mistral 1 missiles, gradually replaced with Mistral 2 missiles. Coupled with Thomson-CSF (Thales Group) RAC 3D radars for target acquisition. The Mistral is carried on a Pinzgauer 712 6×6 for the mobile air defence forces. |
| Skyguard FC; Feuerleitgerät 98 Skyguard (FLGer 98) | | Switzerland | Radar and fire control system | – | Fire control system of Oerlikon GDF anti-air gun. To be replaced by the Skyguard-3 radar, networked operations control. |
| Oerlikon GDF 005; 35 mm ZFlAK 85 | | Switzerland | Towed anti-aircraft gun | 28 | The system will be upgraded to the GDF-009 standard and will use AHEAD ammunition. |

== Boats ==
| Model | Image | Origin | Type | In service | Notes |
Pioneer boats
| Watercat M9; Sturm- und Flachwasserboot (StuFBo) | | Finland | Shallow water boat | 20 | Boats supplied by Marine Alutech. |
| ALU Pi-Boot II; Aluminium Pionier-Mehrzweckboote (Arbeits- und Transportboote, ArbBo) | | Austria | Shallow water boat | 80 | Boats supplied by ÖSWAG Werft Linz AG. |
Special forces boats
| Hurricane H955 Mach II | | France; Austria | RHIB; Rigid hull inflatable boat | – | Boats supplied by Spider-Rock, coming from Zodiac Milpro used by the Jagdkommando. |
| Sillinger Proraid 765 | – | France; Austria | RHIB; Rigid hull inflatable boat | – | Boats supplied by Spider-Rock, used by the Jagdkommando. |

== Aircraft ==
=== Fixed wing aircraft ===
| Model | Image | Origin | Type | In service | Notes |
Fighter aircraft
| Eurofighter Typhoon T1 | | United Kingdom; Germany; Italy; Spain | Multirole fighter | 15 | All aircraft are Tranche 1/Block 5/SRP 4.3, but lack the Praetorian DASS and EuroFIRST PIRATE. Currently with short-range IRIS-T missiles and Rafael Litening 5 targeting pod. |
| Leonardo M-346FA | | Italy | Light fighter / Trainer | 0 (+12 on order) | The M-346 was selected in 2024, and the contract was signed in November 2025. The contract is worth €1.5 billion, and it is scheduled to enter service in 2028. |
Transport aircraft
| Lockheed C-130 Hercules | | United States | Military transport aircraft | 3 | Three former RAF machines (Hercules C Mk.1P) were overhauled, upgraded and delivered between 2003 and 2004. A fourth aircraft to be used for spare parts and ground training was delivered in 2015. |
| Embraer C390 | | Brazil | Military transport aircraft | 0 (+4 on order) | Procurement of successor initiated in 2021 with 4 aircraft planned for 2026 - 2027. Selected as successor in September 2023. It was selected for its capacity to transport a fully equipped Pandur EVO with a mounted weapon station. Contract signed in July 2024 with the Netherlands at the Farnborough Air Show. |
| Pilatus PC-6B Porter | | Switzerland | STOL utility aircraft | 8 | |
Training aircraft
| Diamond DA40 NG | | Austria | Military trainer aircraft | 4 | Used for basic training (Phase 1) and pilot selection. |
| Pilatus PC-7 Turbo Trainer | | Switzerland | Military trainer aircraft | 12 | |

=== Rotary wing aircraft ===
| Model | Image | Origin | Type | In service | Notes |
|---|---|---|---|---|---|
| Bell OH-58 Kiowa | | United States | Observation helicopter | 10 | 12 received from 1978 onwards, 10 remaining in service. To be replaced by the AW-169M (second order) by 2028. |
| Agusta-Bell AB 212 | | United States; Canada; Italy | Utility helicopter | 22 | 23 were in service at the beginning of 2023, but one loss occurred in 2023 in an accident. All helicopters underwent a MLU between 2010 and 2016 (new glass cockpit, defensive aide suite, service life extension until 2041). |
| Sikorsky S-70 Black Hawk; S-70A-42 | | United States | Utility helicopter | 9 | Nine S-70 ordered in 2000 for $183 million with an option for three more (which weren't ordered), all delivered in 2002. A modernisation program in cooperation with Ace Aeronautics LLC is in progress, which includes new avionics and a completely new glass cockpit. |
| Sikorsky S-70 Black Hawk; S-70A-42 | | United States | Utility helicopter | 0 (+3 on order) | Three used UH-60L purchased from Royal Jordanian Air Force in 2020 for $72.8 million. In 2021, the first two helicopters were transferred to Austria. The Air Force signed a contract with Ace Aeronautics LLC to bring it up to the same standard as the Austrian S-70. |
| Sikorsky UH-60M | | United States | Utility helicopter | 0 (+12 on order) | 12 planned to be ordered on 30 June 2024, and to be delivered from 2028. Order signed in June 2026. They will replace part of the AB212. |
| AW169B Lion | | Italy; United Kingdom | Training helicopter | 12 | First order of 18 AW169 in December 2021. The government-to-government (G2G) agreement is valued at €346 million. The aircraft in this order is the successor of the Alouette III. The helicopters are planned to be delivered between 2022 and 2026. The variants ordered are: 6 AW169B for a training role; 12 AW169MA as a multirole (troop transport, disaster relief, emergency response, firefighting, mountain rescue, medical evacuation) / attack variant; Second order of 18 AW169 in December 2022. The government-to-government (G2G) agreement is valued at €304 million. The aircraft in this order is the successor of the remaining Aerospatiale Alouette III and the Bell OH-58 Kiowa. The helicopters are planned to be delivered by 2028. The order is for: 6 AW169B for a training role; 12 AW169MA as a multirole (troop transport, disaster relief, emergency response, firefighting, mountain rescue, medical evacuation) / attack variant; Deliveries: 1st in December 2022; 2nd in March 2023; 3rd in May 2023; 5th in October 2023; 7th in August 2024; 2 more in December 2024; last AW169B in August 2026; The Austrian AW169M is equipped with a skid landing gear and is to be delivered in two variants, training and light utility multi-role tactical variant. The equipment of the tactical variant consists of: Internal weapons: 12.7×99mm NATO machine gun or two pintle-mounted 7.62×51mm NATO machine guns; External weapons: 2 potential pods, whether a 12.7×99mm NATO FN Herstal HMP 400 gun pod, or Hydra 70 rocket pods (7 or 9 guided / unguided rockets); Sensors: laser designator, IR camera, camera, missile approach warning system, laser warning receiver |
| AW169MA Lion | | Italy; United Kingdom | Multirole light utility helicopter / tactical variant | 0 (+24 on order) | |

=== Unmanned Aerial Vehicle ===
| Model | Image | Origin | Type | Role | In service | Notes |
|---|---|---|---|---|---|---|
| SurveyCopter Tracker | | France | UAV; Fixed-wing | Artillery ISR; Intelligence, surveillance, and reconnaissance | 18 | 6 systems, each with 3 drones |
| AscTec Falcon 8 | | Germany | Miniature UAV; Multicopter | Short range ISR; Intelligence, surveillance, and reconnaissance | 1 | |
| Magni-X | | Israel | Miniature UAV; Multicopter | Short range ISR; Intelligence, surveillance, and reconnaissance | 350 | |
| RQ-11 Raven | | United States | UAV; Fixed-wing | Artillery ISR; Intelligence, surveillance, and reconnaissance | 12 | |
| Huginn X1 | – | Denmark | Miniature UAV; Multicopter | ISR; Intelligence, surveillance, and reconnaissance | 1 | Made by Sky-Watch A/S. |
| Riegl RiCopter | – | Austria | Miniature UAV; Multicopter | ISR LIDAR; Intelligence, surveillance, and reconnaissance | 1 | |
| DJI Mavic Pro | | China | Commercial UAV; Multicopter | Aggressor role (Feinddarstellung) | 1 | |
| DJI Phantom 4 | | China | Commercial UAV; Multicopter | Aggressor role (Feinddarstellung) | 1 | |

== Animals ==
| Type | Image | Origin | Type | Quantity | Notes |
|---|---|---|---|---|---|
| Haflinger (Horse) | | Austria | Pack animal | 58 | Assigned to Combat Support Battalion 6 of the 6th Mountain Brigade. Used for logistical purposes. |
| Donkey | | Austria | Pack animal | 8 | Assigned to Combat Support Battalion 6 of the 6th Mountain Brigade. Used for logistical purposes. |

== Future equipment ==
=== Firm orders ===
==== Pandur Evo MTPz (225 on order) ====
Under the development plan "Aufbauplan Bundesheer 2032", the Austrian Army ordered 225 additional Pandur Evo MTPz in February 2024 for €1.8 billion from GDELS Steyr. Twelve variants are planned to be delivered between the end of 2025 and 2032.
Not all suppliers and quantities for each variants are known yet, but the table below summarises the known information:

| Variant | Image | Type | Quantity | Notes |
|---|---|---|---|---|
| Pandur Evo MTPz; Mannschaftstransportpanzer | | APC; Armoured personnel carrier | – | Crew of 3 (driver, gunner, commander) and 8 seats for a fighter group. Modular interior, and could be transformed for CASEVAC role. Equipment supplied by Elbit Systems: ESLAIT WS4 Panther RCWS that can be equipped with: MG 74 (Rheinmetall MG3); 12,7 mm üsMG M2 (M2 Browning); H&K GMG; Driving, and situational awareness systems |
| MTPz PAL; Panzerabwehrlenkwaffe | | Tank destroyer (missile) | – | Same variant as the base MTPz APC, with an anti-tank turret added. Equipment: RCWS that will launch the successor of the RBS-56B Bill 2 (supplier unknown / tbd); Elbit Systems driving, and situational awareness systems; Pandur I EVO presented with MBDA Impact Turret (as on the picture) and Akeron MP at Eurosatory 2024. |
| MTPz Aufkl; Aufklärung | – | Scout vehicle | – | Equipment: ESLAIT WS4 Panther RCWS that can be equipped with: MG 74 (Rheinmetall MG3); 12,7 mm üsMG M2 (M2 Browning); H&K GMG; Reconnaissance mast (supplier unknown / tbd); Elbit Systems driving, and situational awareness systems |
| MTPz JFS; Joint Fire Support | – | Coordination tactical fire support | – | Role: coordinate tactical fire support (artillery, mortar, aircraft, drone). Equipment: ESLAIT WS4 Panther RCWS that can be equipped with: MG 74 (Rheinmetall MG3); 12,7 mm üsMG M2 (M2 Browning); H&K GMG; Elbit Systems driving, and situational awareness systems; Potential equipment: reconnaissance drones and laser guidance |
| MTPz Fü; Führung | – | Command and control | – | Equipment: Command and communication equipment (supplier unknown / tbd); ESLAIT WS4 Panther RCWS that can be equipped with: MG 74 (Rheinmetall MG3); 12,7 mm üsMG M2 (M2 Browning); H&K GMG; Elbit Systems driving, and situational awareness systems |
| MTPz SGrW schwere Granatwerfer | | Mortar carrier | – | Equipment: Elbit Crossbow 120 mm unmanned turret In May 2024 a €49.3 million contract was signed by Elbit for the mortar turret to be installed on the Pandur Evo; Elbit Systems driving, and situational awareness systems |
| MTPz FlA; Skyranger 30 A3; Flakpanzer | | VSHORAD / SPAAG; Very short range air defence / self-propelled anti-air gun | 36 (+ 9 option) | Turret to be supplied by Rheinmetall Air Defence, delivery planned from 2026. Equipment: Oerlikon KCE Canon; AHEAD ammunition (30 × 173 mm); Mistral 3; 76 mm smoke grenades; 3 Hensoldt Spexer AESA radar plates; Rheinmetall electro-optical sensor; Elbit Systems driving, and situational awareness systems |
| MTPz SAN; Sanität | – | Armoured ambulance | – | 2 variants: CASEVAC; MEDEVAC; Equipment: Ambulance equipment; ESLAIT WS4 Panther RCWS that can be equipped with: MG 74 (Rheinmetall MG3); 12,7 mm üsMG M2 (M2 Browning); H&K GMG; Elbit Systems driving, and situational awareness systems |
| MTPz Pi; Pionier | – | Armoured engineering vehicle | – | Equipment: Clearing blade; ESLAIT WS4 Panther RCWS that can be equipped with: MG 74 (Rheinmetall MG3); 12,7 mm üsMG M2 (M2 Browning); H&K GMG; Elbit Systems driving, and situational awareness systems |
| MTPz FüU | – | Communication | – | Role: leadership support with communication systems Equipment: GEROH KV mast; Communication antenna relay; ESLAIT WS4 Panther RCWS that can be equipped with: MG 74 (Rheinmetall MG3); 12,7 mm üsMG M2 (M2 Browning); H&K GMG; Elbit Systems driving, and situational awareness systems |
| MTPz ERFOS; Erfassungs- und Ortungssystem | – | Electronic warfare / SIGINT | – | Equipment: ERFOS 2 detection and location system (SIGINT); Telescopic mast GEROH KV; Antennas from Rohde & Schwarz; ESLAIT WS4 Panther RCWS that can be equipped with: MG 74 (Rheinmetall MG3); 12,7 mm üsMG M2 (M2 Browning); H&K GMG; Elbit Systems driving, and situational awareness systems |
| MTPz STÖRSYS; Störsystems | – | Electronic warfare / Radio jamming | – | Equipment: Radio jamming mast GEROH KV; ESLAIT WS4 Panther RCWS that can be equipped with: MG 74 (Rheinmetall MG3); 12,7 mm üsMG M2 (M2 Browning); H&K GMG; Elbit Systems driving, and situational awareness systems |

==== Other land equipment ====
| Type | Image | Origin | Type | Quantity | Notes |
Vehicles
| INEOS Grenadier - protected | (illustration) | Austria; France | Armoured car | – | |
Engineering equipment
| Weidemann 2060T | | Germany | Telescopic wheel loader | 31 | |

=== Planned investments ===
In 2022, the Defence Minister of the Austrian Armed Forces, Klaudia Tanner unveiled the "Mission Forward" plan, a 10 year long investment plan into the Armed forces amounting over €16 Billion.

| Programme | System | Image | Origin | Type | Quantity | Notes |
Small arms
| Loitering munitions purchase | Tbd | – | – | Loitering munitions | – | |
Armoured fighting vehicles
| – | Leopard 2A8 | | Germany | MBT; Main battle tank | 58 | |
| – | Pandur Evo MTPz | | Austria | Multi-role armoured vehicles | 156 | Option for a further 156 vehicles for delivery after 2032. |
Air defence
| MARS; Military Air Surveillance and Acquisition Radar System | – | – | – | Air surveillance radar | – | |
| European Sky Shield Initiative | IRIS-T SLS | | Germany | Short range air-defence batteries | 4 (fire units) | Austria is planning joint procurement and training with Germany. Each battery procured should be equipped with 3 TEL. |
| European Sky Shield Initiative | IRIS-T SLM | | Germany | Medium range air-defence batteries | 4 (fire units) | Austria is planning joint procurement and training with Germany. Each battery procured should be equipped with 3 TEL. |
| Long range Air defence system | Patriot PAC-3 | | United States; Germany | Long range air-defence batteries | Unknown | The government announced that for the first time in the history of Austria, it would pursue long range air-defence missiles, the project would cost somewhere between €2-4 billion. |
| Long range Air defence system | SAMP/T | | France; Italy | Long range air-defence batteries | Unknown | The government announced that for the first time in the history of Austria, it would pursue long range air-defence missiles, the project would cost somewhere between €2-4 billion. |
| Long range Air defence system | Arrow 3 | | Israel; United States | Long range air-defence batteries | Unknown | The government announced that for the first time in the history of Austria, it would pursue long range air-defence missiles, the project would cost somewhere between €2-4 billion. |
Unmanned Aerial Vehicle
| Unmanned military aircraft combat technology unbemannte Militärluftfahrzeuge Gefechtstechnik (uMilLfz gefte) | – | – | – | Military UAV; Medium-altitude long-endurance UAV | 12 | To enter service in 2029. |
