= Despot (vehicle) =

Type of armoured personnel carrier

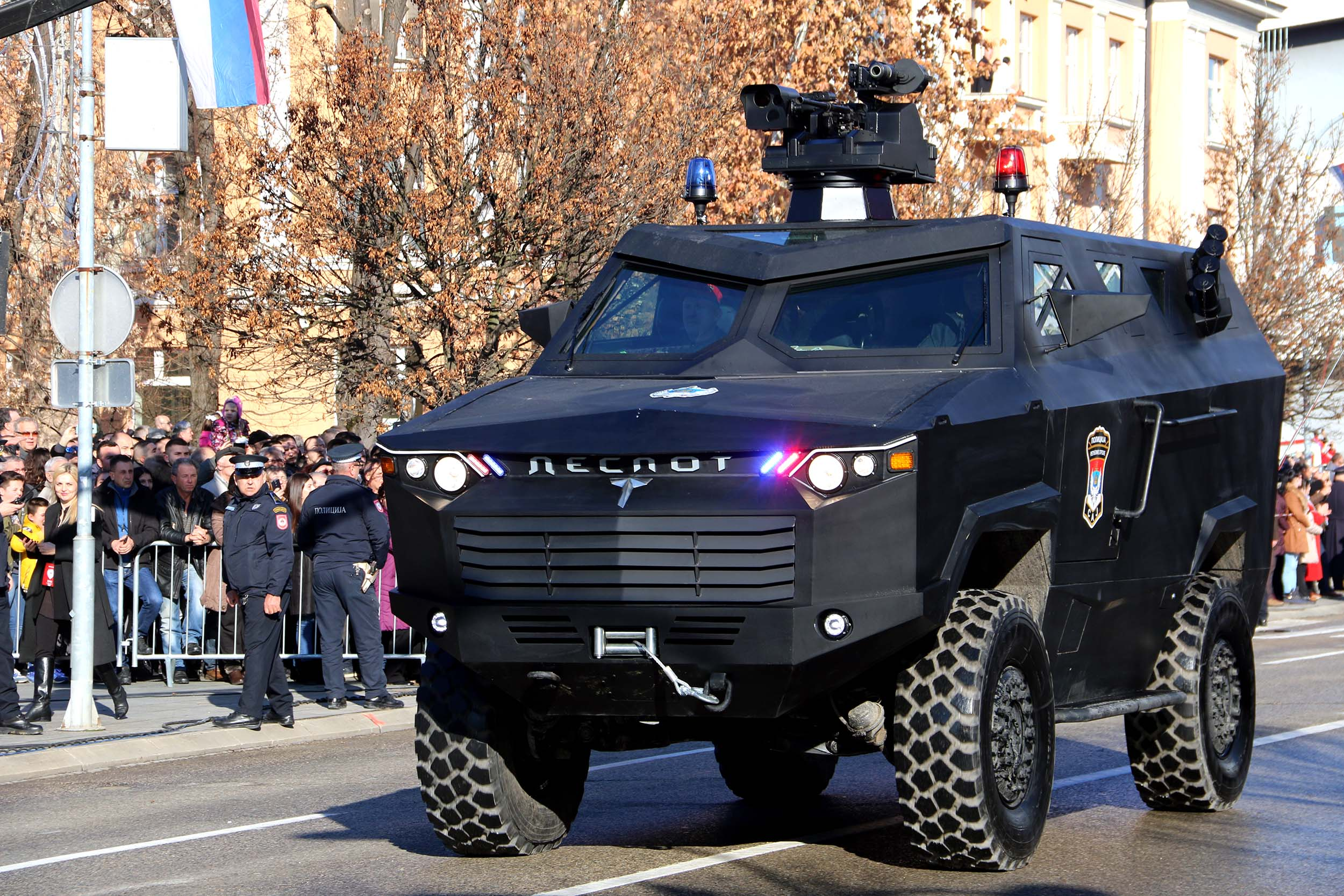
- Type: Armoured personnel carrier
- Place of origin: Bosnia and Herzegovina

Service history
- Used by: Police of Republika Srpska

Production history
- Designer: Tehnički remont Bratunac
- Manufacturer: Tehnički remont Bratunac
- Produced: 2019–present
- No. built: ~22

Specifications
- Mass: 12 tonnes 14 tonnes (max)
- Length: 6.05 m (19 ft 10 in)
- Width: 2.56 m (8 ft 5 in)
- Height: 2.70 m (8 ft 10 in)
- Crew: max. 9 (3+6)
- Armor: STANAG 4569 Level 2; ballistic and anti-mine protection
- Engine: Mercedes-Benz 7.2 engine 240 kW (322 hp)
- Suspension: 4×4 wheeled
- Maximum speed: 120 km/h

Despot (Serbian Cyrillic: Деспот) is a multi-functional armoured vehicle developed by the arms manufacturer Tehnički remont Bratunac in Bratunac, Republika Srpska, Bosnia and Herzegovina.

The vehicle can be used for police and military purposes. Its main roles are patrol and reconnaissance missions, commanding, transport and support of special operation units, medical purposes, counter-terrorism operations and peace action in cases of different weather conditions.

A prototype was unveiled to the public on January 9, 2019 during the annual Republic Day parade in Banja Luka. The first two serially produced models were procured for the Training Center of the Ministry of Interior of Republika Srpska in Zalužani, near Banja Luka, where the vehicles will be stationed for the purposes of the Special Anti-Terrorist Unit.

It has been reported that countries such as Namibia, Tanzania, Israel and Russia have expressed interest in the vehicle.

In 2021, one vehicle was armed with a 12,7mm turret and four with 7,62mm turrets produced by South African defence manufacturer Dynateg International PTY.

== Users ==
- Ethiopia – 10 vehicles delivered (five in 2022 and five in 2023).
- Republika Srpska – Republika Srpska's Special Anti-Terrorist Unit operates 12 vehicles. The delivery of 30 vehicles was originally planned but was halted by EUFOR on the grounds that it would disrupt the balance of power between Republika Srpska and the Federation of Bosnia and Herzegovina.
