= Special Anti-Terrorist Unit (Republika Srpska) =

- Patch of the Special Anti-Terrorist Unit
- Abbreviation: SAJ (САЈ)
- Motto: Ми немамо право на грешку! "We are not entitled to make a mistake!"

Agency overview
- Formed: 4 April 1992; 34 years ago
- Employees: 1,500

Jurisdictional structure
- Operations jurisdiction: Republika Srpska
- Governing body: Ministry of Interior (Republika Srpska)

Operational structure
- Headquarters: Training Center of the Ministry of Interior of Republika Srpska, Zalužani
- Agency executive: Goran Balaban, Commander

Notables
- Award: Petar Mrkonjić Medal

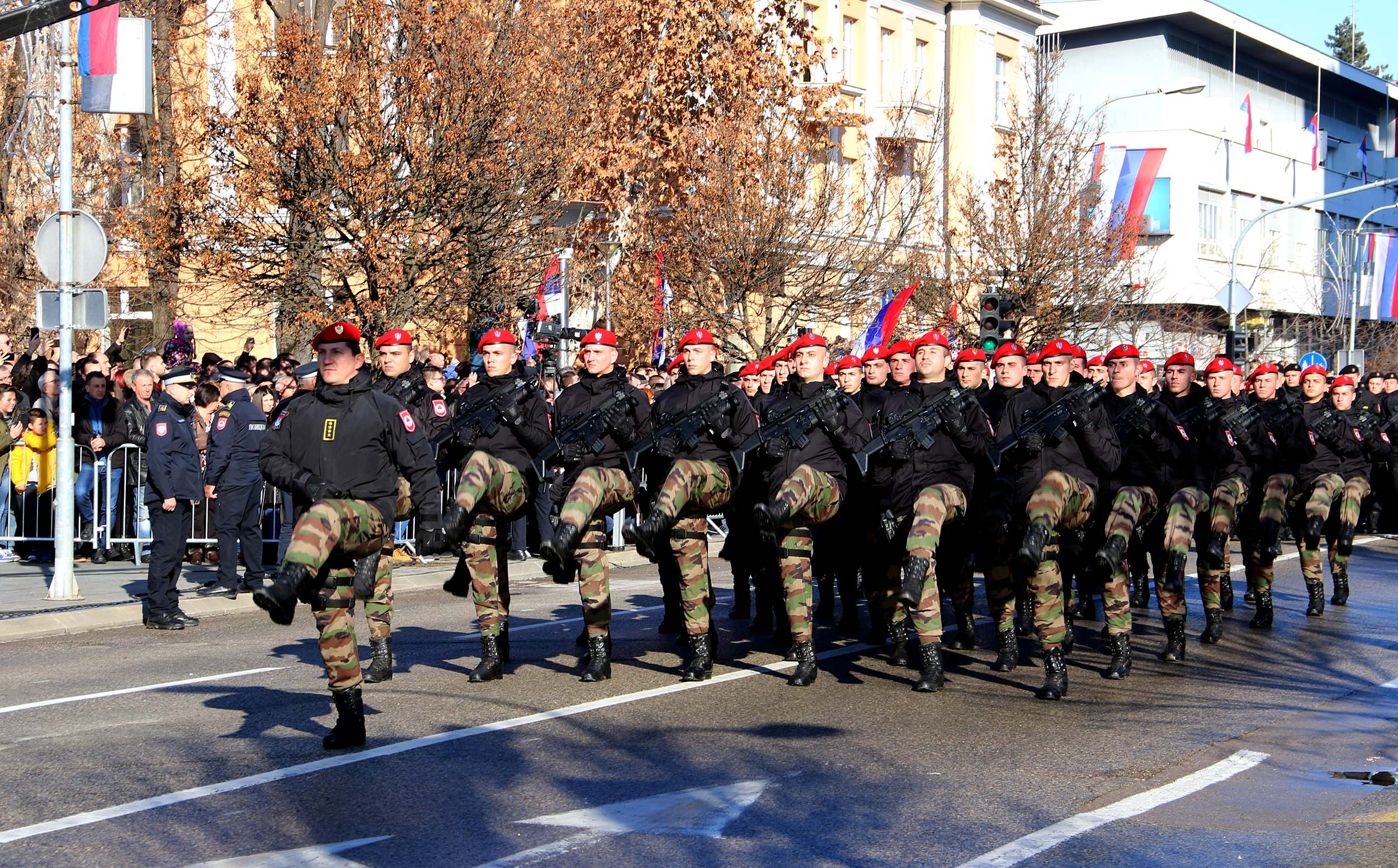
Members of the Special Anti-Terrorist Unit during a Republic Day parade in Banja Luka, 2019

The Special Anti-Terrorist Unit of Ministry of Interior of Republika Srpska (Serbian: Specijalna antiteroristička jedinica Ministarstva unutrašnjih poslova Republike Srpske, SAJ; Serbian Cyrillic: Специјална антитерористичка јединица Министарства унутрашњих послова Републике Српске, САЈ) is a special police and security force unit of the Police of Republika Srpska, one of two autonomous entities that comprise Bosnia and Herzegovina.

== History ==
The unit's history can be divided into three stages: from 1992–1995, from 1995–2001 and from 2001 onward. It was founded on 4 April 1992 as the Special Police Brigade (Serbian: Специјална бригада полиције, Specijalna brigada policije; or SBP) and took part in many battles during the Bosnian War. During that time, the brigade's headquarters were located in Janja, near Bijeljina, and the unit was divided into nine battalion-sized detachments:

- I – Pale
- II – Šekovići
- III – Trebinje
- IV – Bijeljina
- V – Doboj
- VI – Banja Luka
- VII – Prijedor
- VIII – Ilidža
- IX – Foča

Each detachment was designed to operate independently on the battlefield, and had three special infantry platoons, an armored-mechanized platoon, as well as mortar, logistics and communications platoons. The brigade had around 1,400 personnel, of whom 144 were killed and about 400 wounded in the war.

During the second stage of the unit's development, the brigade was renamed the Specialized Police Service (Служба специјализоване полиције, Služba specijalizovane policije; or SSP). The Prijedor and Ilidža detachments were disbanded and the Trebinje and Foča detachments were relocated to Tjentište. Afterwards, all the detachments except for those in Janja and Banja Luka were disbanded, and the unit's headquarters were moved to Banja Luka.

After 2001, the Specialized Police Service was relocated to Rakovačke Bare, in Banja Luka, and organized into three teams: Anti-Terrorist, Specialized and Mechanized. In 2004, it was renamed the Special Police Unit (Специјална јединица полиције, Specijalna jedinica policije; or SJP), and the following year, its headquarters was moved to the police base "Sarica" in the village of Trn, near Banja Luka. In 2016, the unit assumed its current name and its headquarters were moved to Zalužani.

Commander	Tenure
Milenko Karišik	1992–1993
Goran Sarić	1993–1997
Dušan Jević	1997–1999
Dragan Lukač	1999–2004
Ranko Vuković	2004–2006
Predrag Krajnović	2006–2015
Dragan Ribić	2015–2018
Goran Balaban	2018–present

== Present-day ==
Today, the SAJ is the most elite unit of Republika Srpska's Ministry of Interior and cooperates with other special units in region and Europe, like Serbia's SAJ and Gendarmery, the Slovene SEP, the French GIGN, the German GSG 9, and the Italian GIS.

The main duties of the unit are:

- organizing and completing the most complex security and counter-terrorism tasks
- establishing peace and public order in the most difficult and risky situations
- resolving high-risk situations

=== Organization ===
The unit has its own command that is subordinated to the Director of Police and consists of seven teams: the A Team (responsible for the most demanding missions), the B Team, the C Team, the D Team, the Special Preparation and Logistic Support Team (Тим за специјалну и логистичку подршку), the Specialized Team (Специјализовани тим) and the Operative Support Team (Тим за оперативну подршку).

== Equipment ==
=== Small arms ===
Name	Origin	Type	Notes
CZ99	Yugoslavia/Serbia	Semi-automatic pistol	Used only for training
Glock-17	Austria	Semi-automatic pistol	Primary service pistol
Glock-19	Austria	Semi-automatic pistol	
CZ 85	Czechoslovakia	Semi-automatic pistol	
CZ Scorpion Evo 3	Czechoslovakia	Submachine gun	
HK MP5	Germany	Submachine gun	Uses the A5 and SD-3 variants
Zastava M-84A "Škorpion"	Yugoslavia	Submachine gun	
Brügger & Thomet APC9	Switzerland	Submachine gun	
Zastava M-70	Yugoslavia	Assault rifle	Uses the AB1 and AB2 variants
Zastava M21	Serbia and Montenegro	Assault rifle	Uses the SBS variant
FN SCAR	Belgium	Assault rifle	
Zastava M76	Yugoslavia	Sniper rifle	
Zastava M91	Serbia and Montenegro	Sniper rifle	
Steyr Tactical Elite	Austria	Sniper rifle	
Steyr SSG 04	Austria	Sniper rifle	Uses the A1 variant
Zastava M93 Black Arrow	Yugoslavia	Sniper rifle	
Zastava M84	Yugoslavia	General-purpose machine gun	

=== Armoured vehicles ===
Name	Origin	Type	Number	Notes
Despot	Republika Srpska, Bosnia and Herzegovina	Armoured personnel carrier	12	
Vihor	Republika Srpska, Bosnia and Herzegovina	Armoured mobility vehicle	5	
BOV M-86	Socialist Federative Republic of Yugoslavia	Armoured personnel carrier	4	

=== Utility vehicles ===
Name	Origin	Type	Notes
VW Golf IV	Germany	C	
Mercedes-Benz Vito	Germany	Van	

=== Aircraft ===
Name	Origin	Type	Number	Notes
Aérospatiale Gazelle	France	Utility helicopter	1	SA-341H
Kazan Ansat	Russia	Utility helicopter	3	

== See also ==
- Police of Republika Srpska
- Ministry of Interior (Republika Srpska)
