= Model 67 =

Model 67 may refer to:

- Curtiss BF2C Goshawk (Model 67), a United States naval biplane aircraft in the 1930s
- IBM System/360 Model 67, an IBM mainframe computer of the late 1960s
- Model 67 mine, an Austrian anti-tank mine
- Mauser-Norris Model 67, a German bolt-action rifle
- Smith & Wesson Model 67, an American revolver
- Winchester Model 67, an American bolt-action rifle
