= Jagdkommando =

Austrian Armed Forces' Special Operations group

Austrian Special Operations Forces
- Jagdkommando
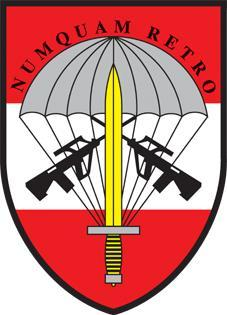
- Jagdkommando Logo
- Founded: 1962
- Country: Austria
- Branch: Special Operations Forces
- Type: Special forces
- Role: Counter-terrorism; Counterinsurgency; Direct action; Special reconnaissance; Unconventional warfare; Hostage rescue
- Size: ≈400
- Part of: Austrian Armed Forces
- Garrison/HQ: Wiener Neustadt, Austria
- Nickname: JaKdo
- Mottos: Numquam Retro (Latin) (Never retreat)
- Engagements: KFOR; EUFOR Bosnia and Herzegovina; EUFOR Tchad/RCA; War in Afghanistan (ISAF/Resolute Support, 2001–2022); Syria (UNDOF, 1974–2013); Mali (Operation Barkhane, EUTM)

Commanders
- Current commander: Colonel Arthur Bennett

The Jagdkommando (English: Hunting Commando) is the Austrian Armed Forces' special forces unit. The unit is based at Wiener Neustadt and is known to have a manpower of 400 operators.

== History ==
The history of the Austrian Special Operations Forces begins in 1961, when a group of Austrian officers participated in the US Army's Ranger School as part of their training in order to set up a similar course for the eventual establishment of Jagdkommando. Jagdkommando training courses were set up on May 4, 1963, to train the first operators.

The Jagdkommando is the Austrian Armed Forces' special forces unit. The name Jagdkommando has its origins in the time of World War I, when small assault squads of the Austro-Hungarian Army were called what translates to "manhunt command".

Most of the missions are classified, but the Jagdkommando usually operates in places where regular Austrian troops are also located - such as the Balkans (KFOR, etc.), Afghanistan (ISAF/Resolute Support), and Chad (EUFOR Tchad/RCA). In the eastern area of Chad, about 50 Jagdkommando soldiers were deployed to protect refugee camps near the border to Darfur from early 2008 to 2009.

In 2012, it was reported that Jagdkommando selected a female Austrian soldier to serve in the unit.

In 2016, the Jagdkommando deployed to Mali alongside French Special Forces as part of Operation Barkhane. In 2018, it was reported that Jagdkommando operators were in Burkina Faso to train Burkinabean troops.

On November 3, 2022, Jagdkommando has adopted Multicam Arid as their official camouflage uniform.

== Structure ==
The unit is based at Wiener Neustadt. It is known to have a manpower of 400 operators. The unit is structured according to the following:

- Headquarters
  - 1st Special Operations Task Group (Has fewer than 100 operators under a major)
  - 2nd Special Operations Task Group (Has fewer than 100 operators under a major)
  - 3rd Special Operations Task Group (Reserve)

== Roles ==
Jagdkommando is known to operate under the following roles:

- Reconnaissance
- Commando operations (includes amphibious operations)
- Counter-terrorist operations
- SAR operations
- Military training with soldiers from partner/friendly countries
- Military aid to the civil power
- Non-combatant evacuation operations

The unit was formerly in charge of VIP protection, but the responsibility was handed to Austrian Military Police units.

== Training ==
Selection is usually held once a year and has a duration of 6 months. The program normally begins in January with 3 weeks (21 days) of pre-selection. During this time the candidate will take the physical tests required, receive additional training, and undergo a 72-hour (3-day) Field Exercise, which is the core event of the selection process.

Most candidates will fail during the 72-hour (3-day) exercise, which includes long road marches in squad size elements, psychological test batteries, and total sleep deprivation. The pre-selection course is conducted both by active operators and by enablers of the unit.

Normally, 20-25% of all candidates will pass the pre selection course and continue with the so-called Jagdkommandogrundkurs, the basic course of selection. The first few weeks are held in the remote area of Allentsteig, a giant military training area in close proximity to the Czech border. The first seven weeks of small unit tactics are overshadowed with plenty of snow, freezing weather, very small amounts of sleep, and continuous physical performance. Candidates get used to a heavy Lowe Rucksack and spend most of their day with it on their backs while conducting patrols, ambushes, and raids in the forests around Allentsteig.

After the small unit tactics phase, which eliminates the last few unfitting candidates, the basic course continues with block courses of two or three weeks each:

- Basic Demolition Course
- Airborne Course
- Amphibious Insertion/Extraction Course
- Field Survival Course
- Basic CQB Course
- Combat Diver Course
- Field Training Exercises
- SERE

=== SERE ===
The final and most infamous course is the SERE training. Over the last few years, the SERE training has been taking part in the Alps of Salzburg. The "run phase" lasts up to ten days, while the candidate must check in at given checkpoints every 24 hours. The checkpoints are set 20–30 km (12–19 mi) apart. Considering the mountains in between the points and the tactical need to stay off roads and trails, the candidates are typically very busy meeting their time limits, and they have little time to sleep. Finally, after days on the run and being hunted down by infantry units, helicopters, and K9 units, the candidates are ambushed and captured at one of their checkpoints. This marks the beginning of the "captivity phase". Being the last phase of the selection course, this phase lasts 72 hours (3 days).

=== Further training ===
- After completing the SERE course, the remaining soldiers (normally 10-15% of all applicants who started the pre selection course) are accepted into the Jagdkommando brotherhood and awarded the "mud-green" beret with the Unit Crest on it. Most of the graduates will be given a slot as active operators in one of the two Task Groups of the unit, while some go back to their regular Army unit.
- If a soldier is chosen to become an operator after selection, he will attend the Einsatzausbildung 1, a course where he will refine his operator skills. The training will last up to one year.
- Normally, it starts off with a five-week drivers course, followed by shooting classes. This will be the first time for operators to use the advanced weapon systems Steyr AUG A2 Kdo and the FN P90. After weeks at the shooting range, the next courses will be very mountain orientated, like the mountain airborne course, winter warfare and mountaineering courses, and ski training.
- After the mountain courses, the individual job training will begin. Depending on the assignment the operator will attend the Weapon Sergeant Course, Medic Course, Communications Sergeant Course or Engineer Course.
- The SOF CQB course that follows teaches the latest techniques in HRO, CC, and DDO. Jagdkommando operators train together with several NATO SOF units worldwide and so the used SOPs and tactics are very similar to other SOF units.
- Different other courses will complete the Einsatzausbildung 1, such as the Urban SR course, advanced combatives training, and Air Assault techniques.
- After more than 18 months of training the operator will be assigned a team in the 1st SOTG (Special Operations Task Group) or the 2nd SOTG. The 3rd SOTG belongs to the Army Reserve Component. A typical Jagdkommando team consists of six operators: the Team Leader, Team Sergeant, a Weapons Sergeant/Sniper, Engineer Sergeant, Medic Sergeant and Communication Sergeant. Each team is assigned to one insertion speciality, such as freefall, amphibious, mountain, and mobility.

== Weapons ==
Name	Country of origin	Type	Notes
Glock	Austria	Semi-automatic pistol	17, 18, 21 and 26 variants used
FN P90	Belgium	Personal defence weapon	
Remington 870	United States	Shotgun	
Steyr AUG	Austria	Assault rifle	
Heckler & Koch HK416	Germany	Assault rifle	
Heckler & Koch HK417P	Germany	Battle rifle	
Steyr SSG 69	Austria	Sniper rifle	
Steyr SSG 04	Austria	Sniper rifle	
Steyr SSG 08	Austria	Sniper rifle	
Steyr SSG M1	Austria	Sniper rifle	
Barrett M82	United States	Sniper rifle	
Barrett M95	United States	Sniper rifle	
MG74	Germany	Machine gun	
M2 Browning	United States	Machine gun	

== Gallery ==
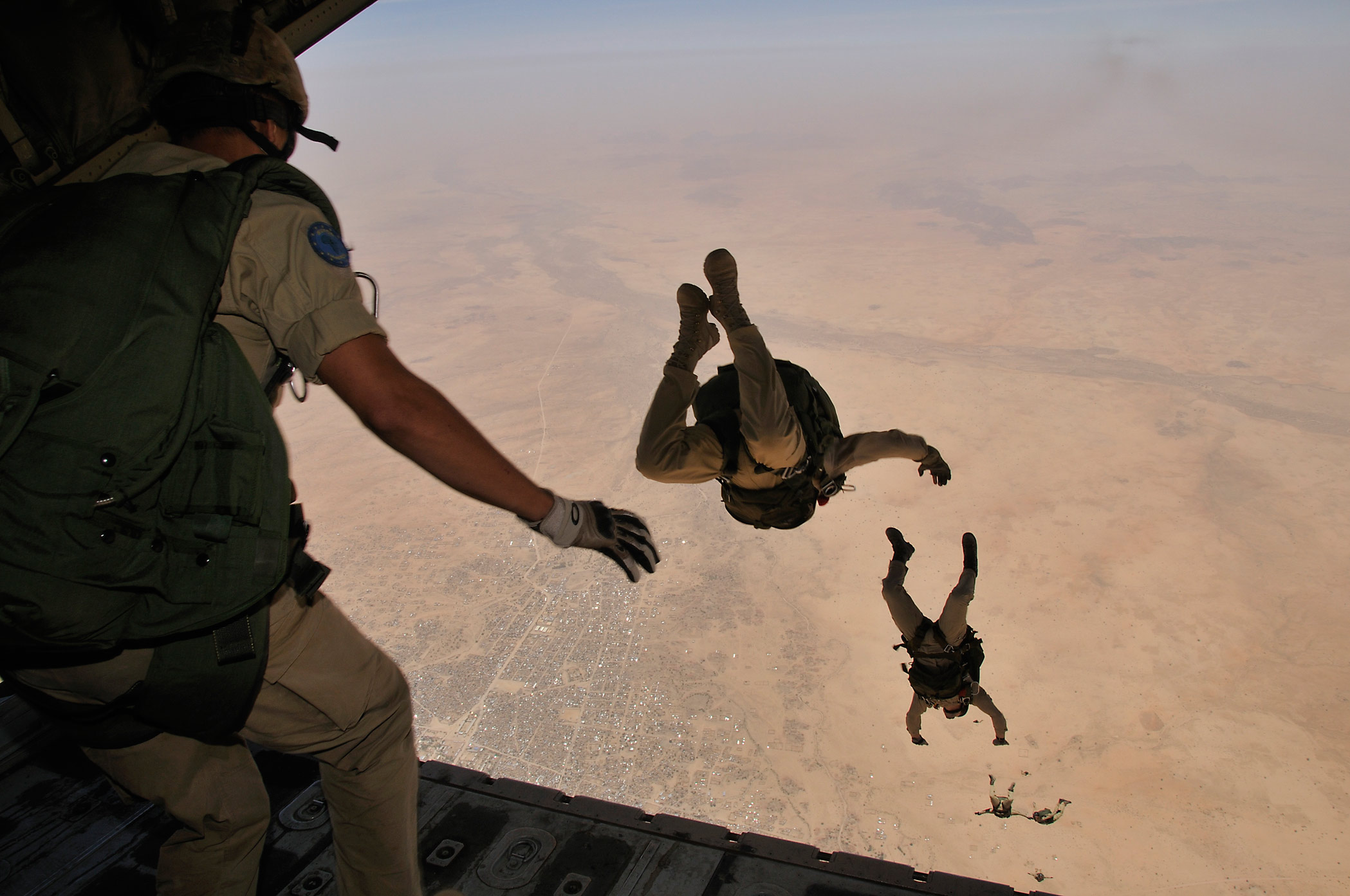
Jagdkommando airborne operations

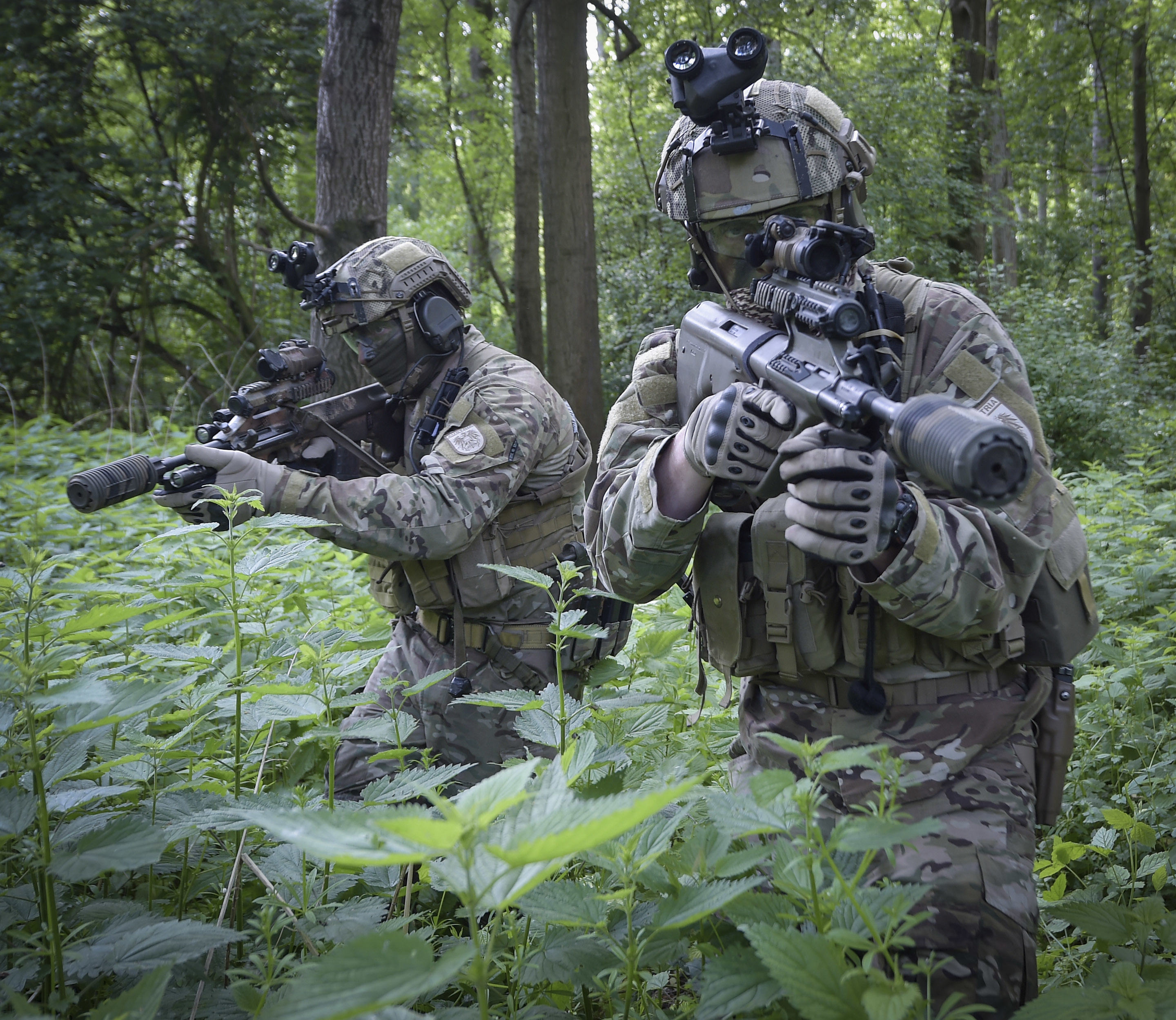
Two soldiers of the Jagdkommando

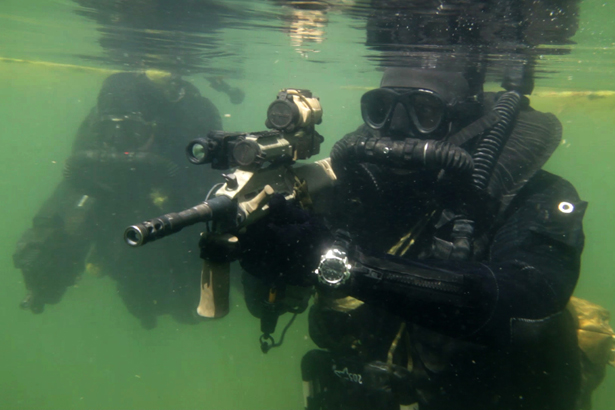
Jagdkommando frogmen

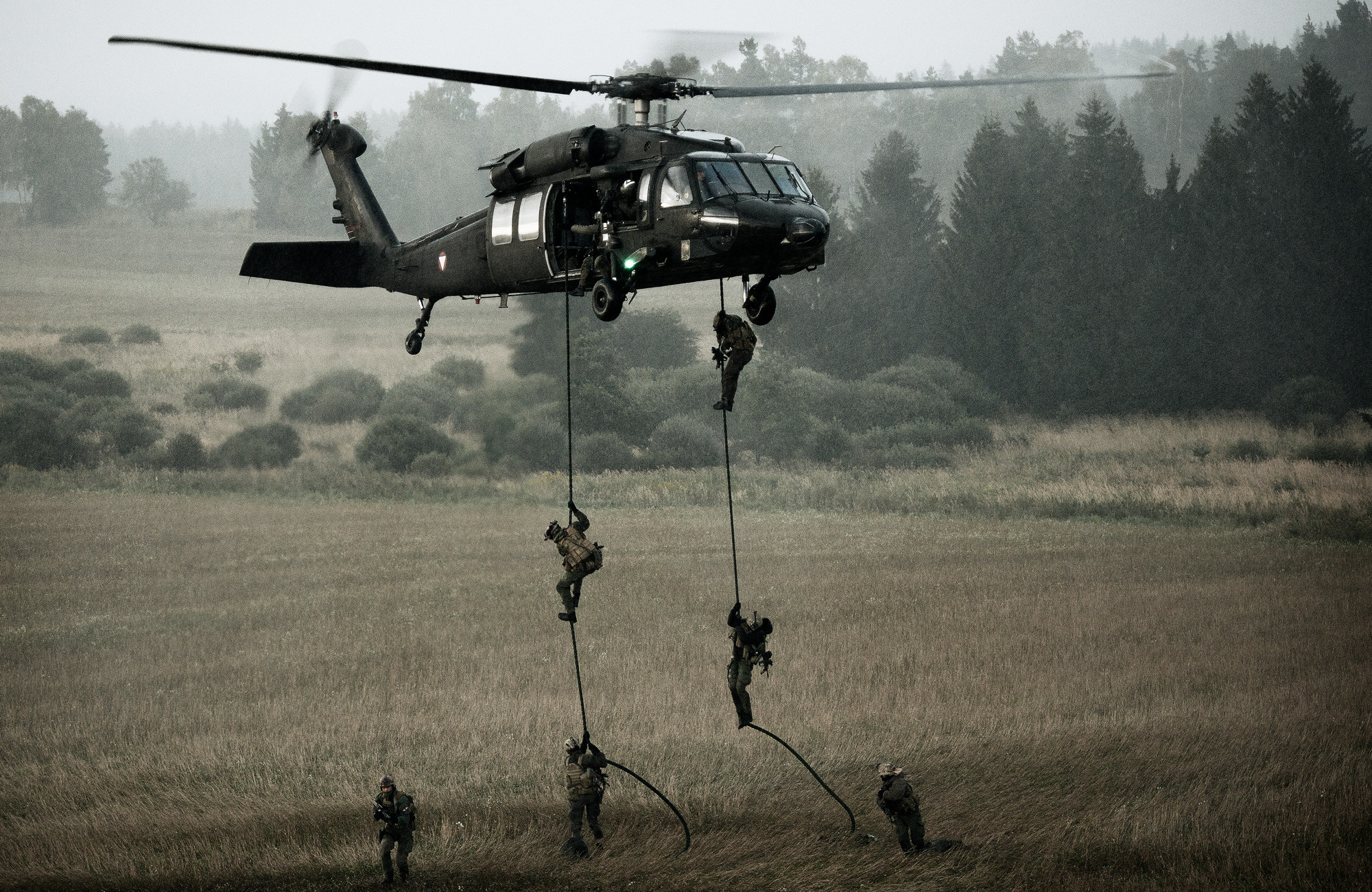
Soldiers of the Jagdkommando rope down a Sikorsky UH-60 Black Hawk

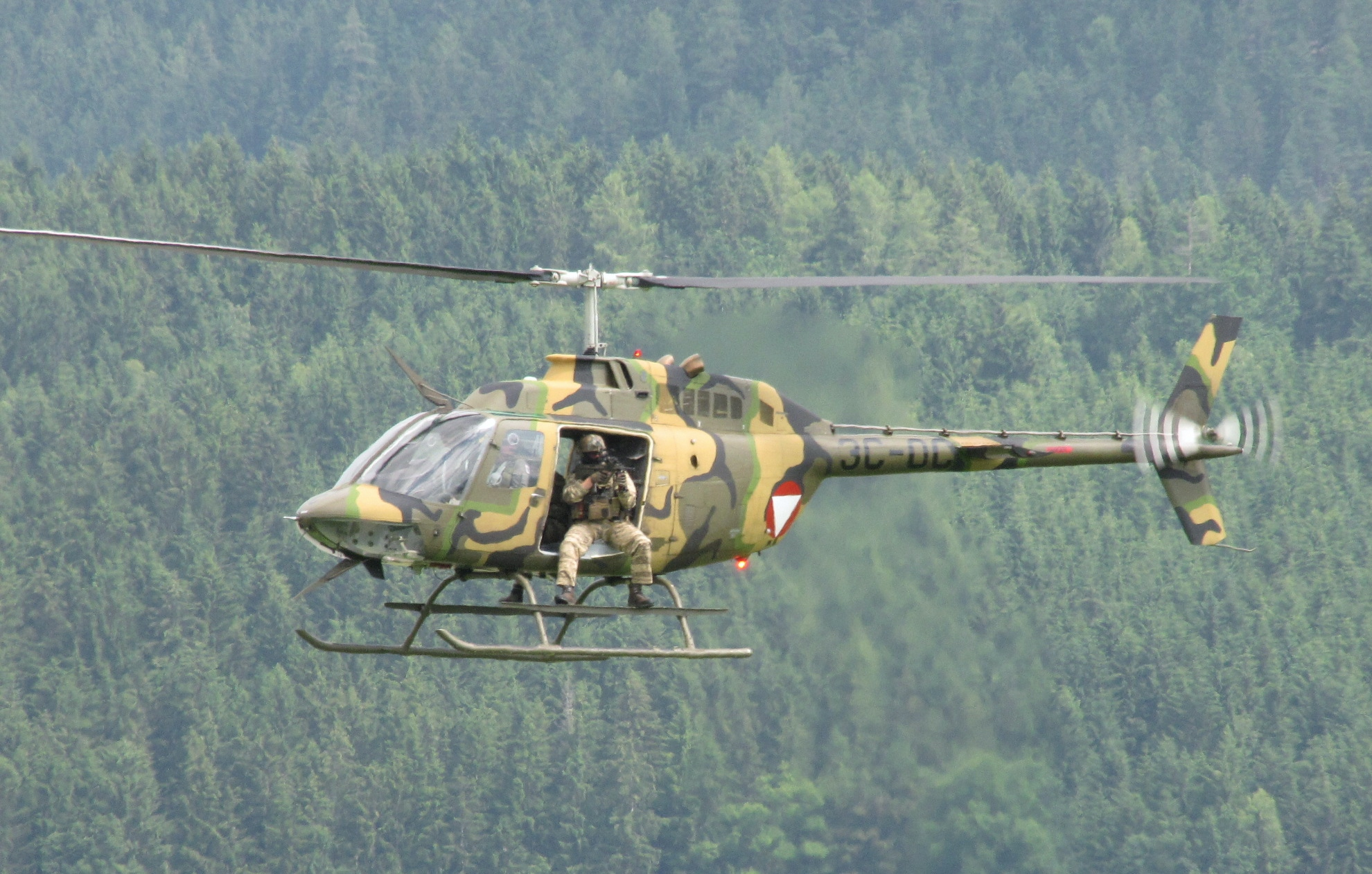
A soldier of the Jagdkommando on a Bell OH-58 Kiowa

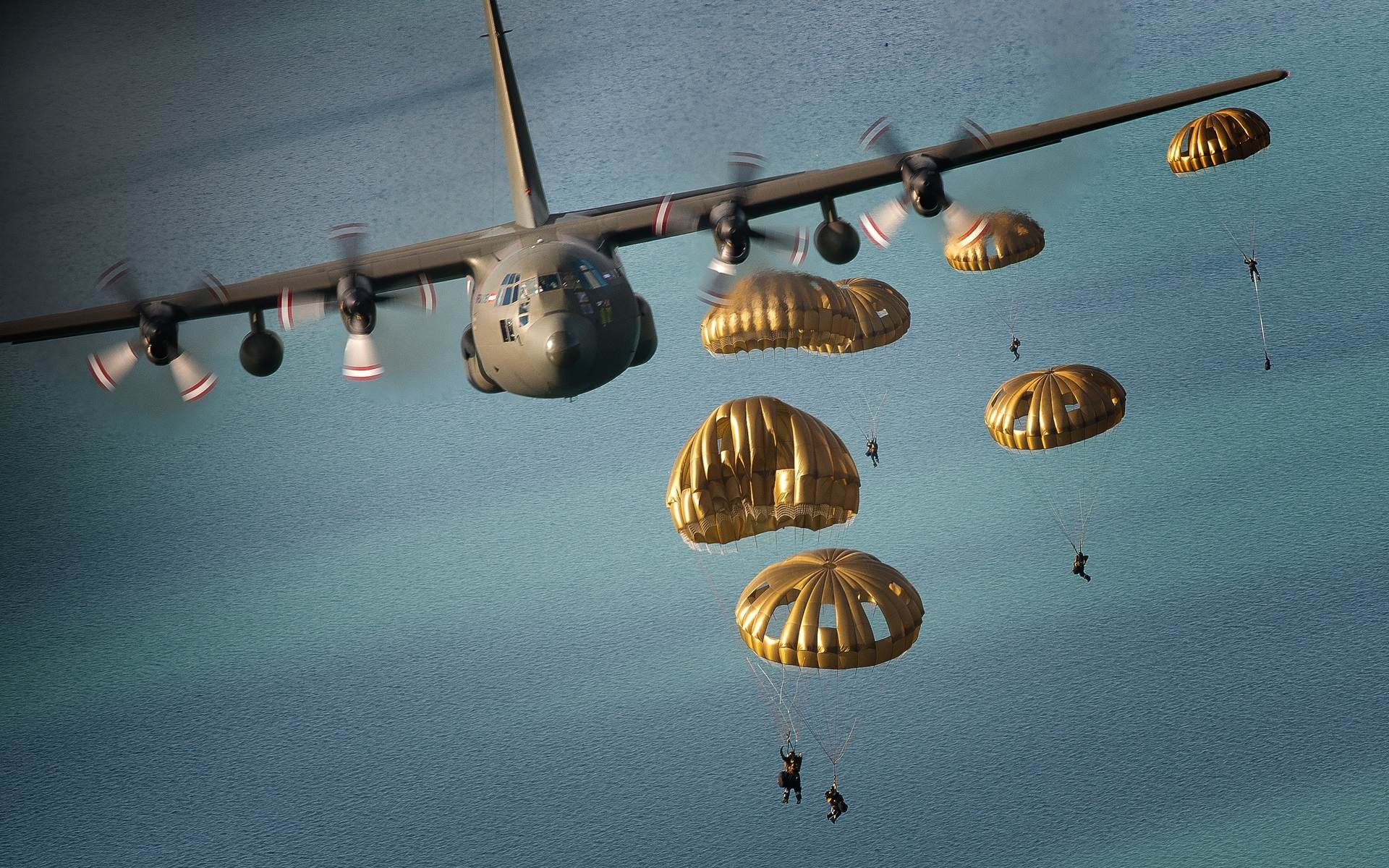
Jagdkommando soldiers jump out of a C-130 Hercules

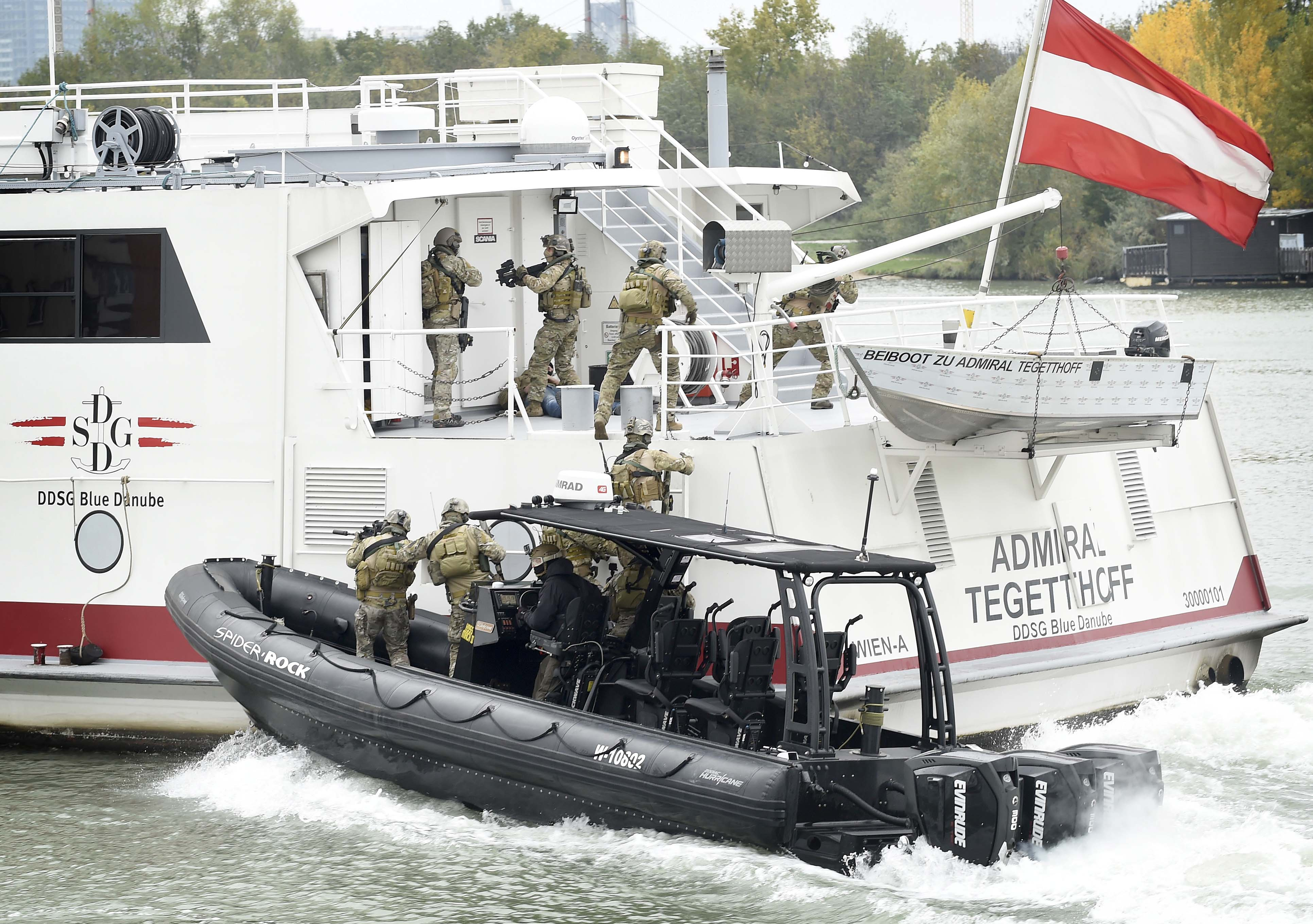
Soldiers of the Jagdkommando capture a ship on the Danube

== See also ==
- Austro-Hungarian assault units
