= Training Center of the Ministry of Interior of Republika Srpska =

- Центар за обуку Министарства унутрашњих послова Републике Српске; Centar za obuku Ministarstva unutrašnjih poslova Republike Srpske
- Part of Ministry of Interior of Republika Srpska
- Kuljani, Banja Luka in Republika Srpska, Bosnia and Herzegovina

Site information
- Owner: Ministry of Interior
- Operator: Police of Republika Srpska
- Open to the public: No

Location
- Coordinates: 44°50′35.5″N 17°13′02.8″E

Site history
- Built: 2018, reconstructed
- Built by: reconstruction: Elmorad, AM Međugorje

Garrison information
- Current commander: Mladen Marić
- Occupants: Police of Republika Srpska; Special Anti-Terrorist Unit of the Ministry of Interior of Republika Srpska

Training Center of the Ministry of Interior of Republika Srpska (Serbian: Центар за обуку Министарства унутрашњих послова Републике Српска, Centar za obuku Ministarstva unutrašnjih poslova Republike Srpske) is police-type barracks managed by the Ministry of Interior of the Republika Srpska. The center's main use is the training of police officers and as headquarters for police units and police administrations. It is located near Zalužani Airfield in Zalužani, Banja Luka.

The training Center opened on April 4, 2018, during a celebration of the Day of Police, and was opened by the president of Republika Srpska Milorad Dodik, former prime-minister Željka Cvijanović and minister of interior Dragan Lukač. The center is set in the former Zalužani Barracks.

== Gallery ==
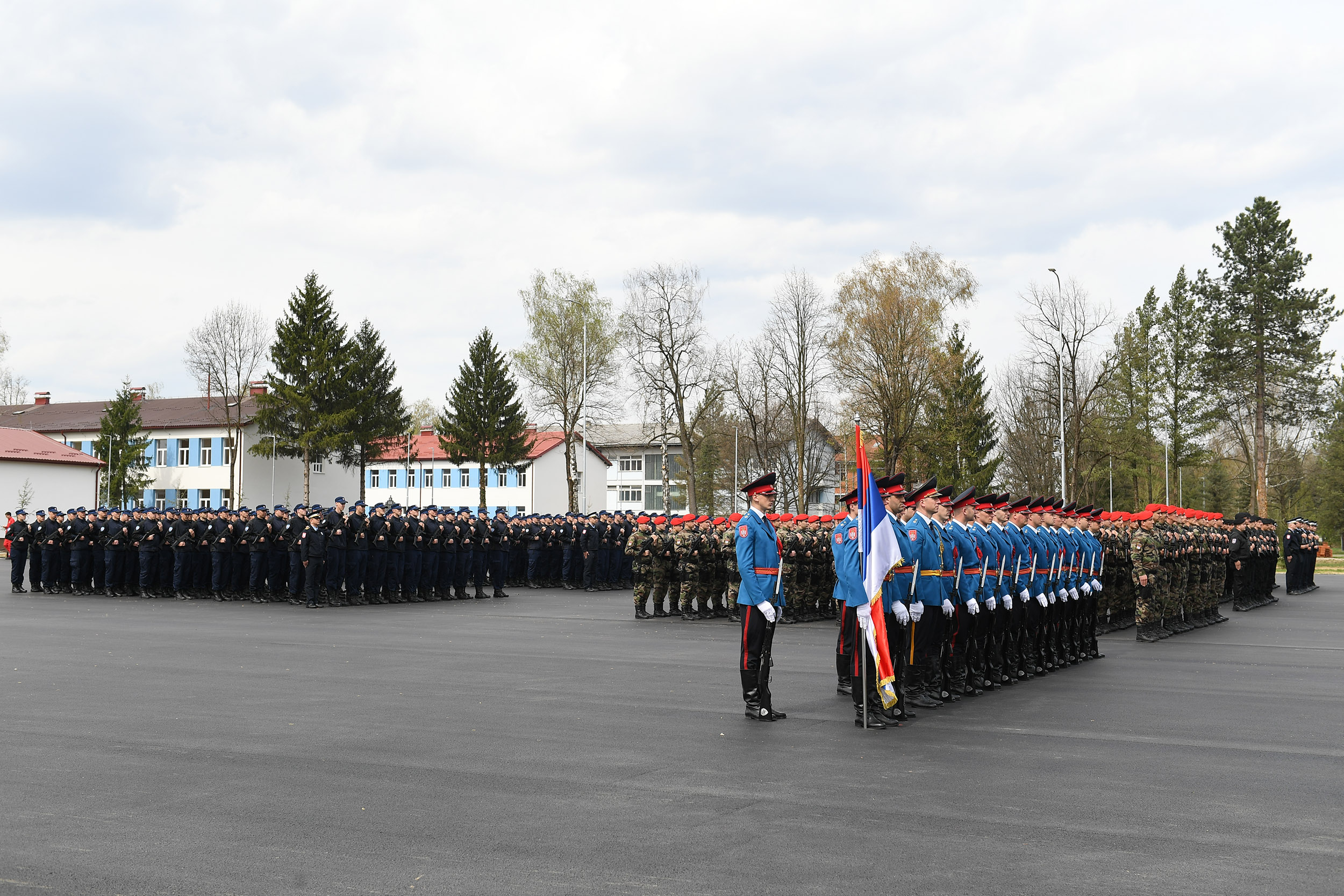
Police formations in the Training Center on Police Day 2019

== See also ==
- Zalužani
- Police of Republika Srpska
