= Steyr SSG 04 =

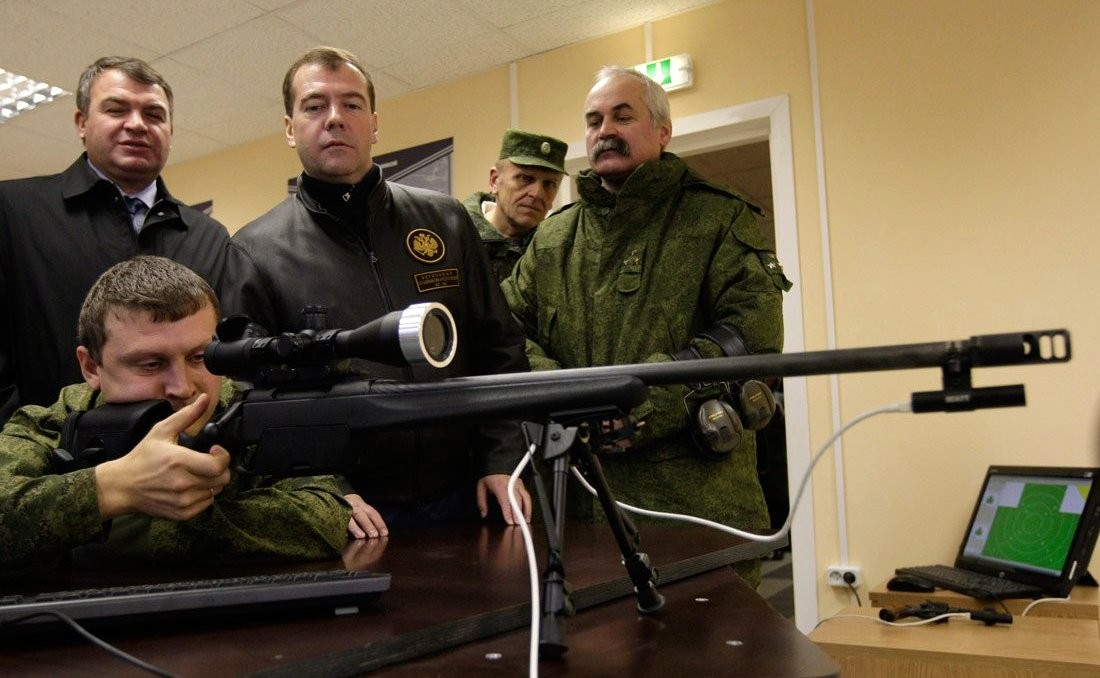
- Type: Sniper rifle
- Place of origin: Austria

Service history
- Used by: See Users

Production history
- Manufacturer: Steyr Mannlicher
- Produced: 2004–2023
- Variants: SSG 04 A1

Specifications
- Mass: 4.706 kg (10.375 lb) (unloaded)
- Length: 1,080 mm (42.6 in) (510 mm barrel); 1,170 mm (46.2 in) (600 mm barrel)
- Barrel length: 510 mm (20 in); 600 mm (23.6 in)
- Cartridge: .308 Winchester.300 Winchester Magnum
- Caliber: 7.62 mm (0.3 in)
- Action: Bolt action
- Feed system: 10-round detachable box magazine (.308 Winchester); 8-round detachable box magazine (.300 Win Mag)
- Sights: 20 MOA Picatinny rail

The Steyr SSG 04 (German: Scharfschützengewehr 2004, English: Sniper Rifle 04) is a modern bolt-action sniper rifle developed and produced by Steyr Mannlicher in Austria, as a complement to Steyr's SSG 69, using the same Safe Bolt System (SBS) action developed for Steyr's hunting rifles. It is also the basis for the Steyr SSG 08 and Steyr SSG Carbon.

== Design ==
It is available in .308 Winchester, with either a 510-millimetre (20 in) ("compact") or 600-millimetre (23.6 in) heavy barrel, or .300 Winchester Magnum, with a 600-millimetre (23.6 in) heavy barrel. There is one variant; the SSG 04 A1, which replaces the base model's Picatinny rail over the action with a shroud attached to the receiver, that covers the barrel for the length of the forend.

Atop the shroud is a Picatinny rail that runs from the rear of the receiver to the front of the shroud, and two shorter lengths of Picatinny rail are mounted on either side of the front of the shroud.

== Users ==
- Bolivia
- Bosnia and Herzegovina
  - Republika Srpska: SSG 04 A1 used by Special Anti-Terrorist Unit.
- Indonesia: SSG 04 A1 in .308 Winchester.
- Ireland
- Russia
