= Steyr SSG 08 =

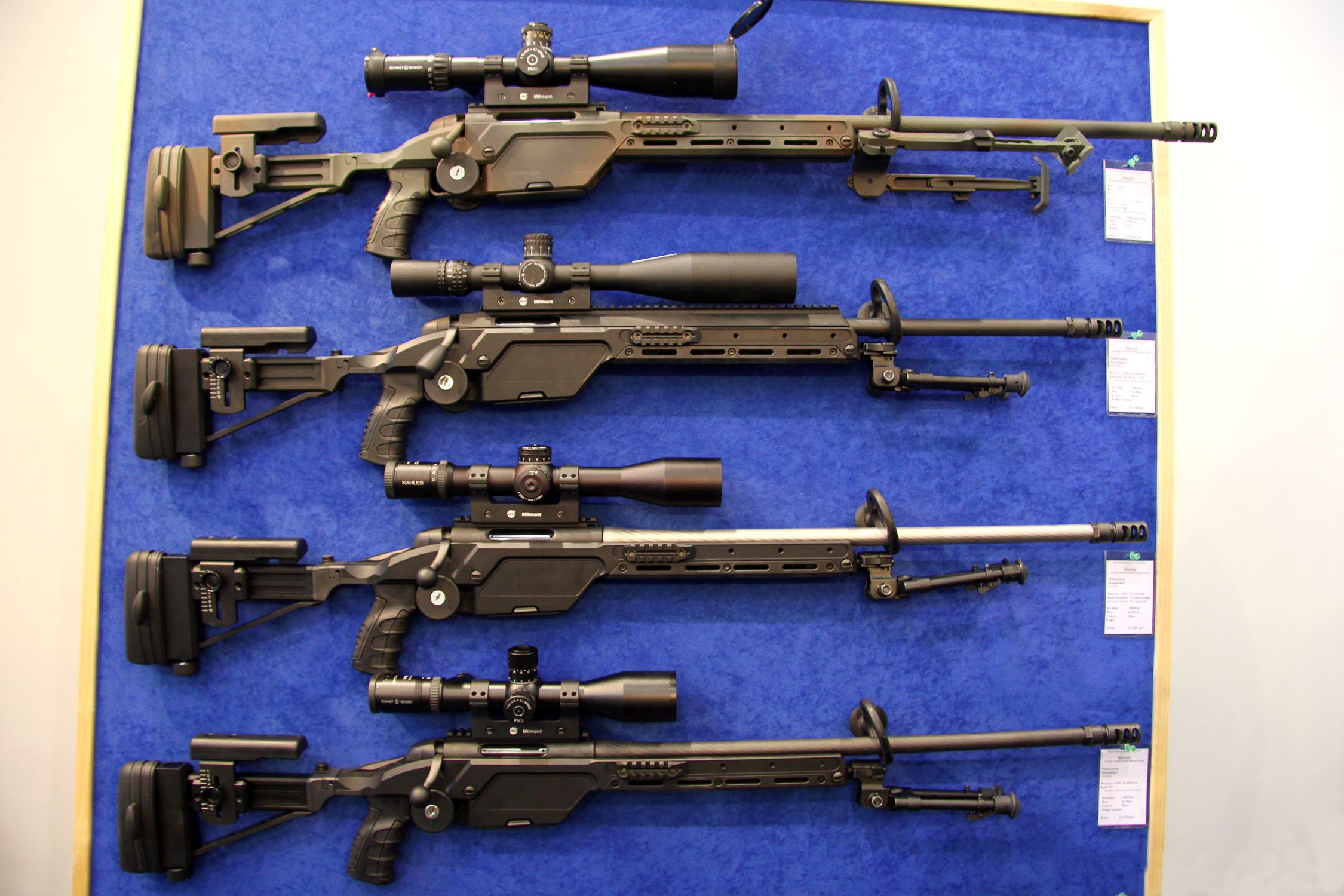
- Several SSG 08s being exhibited at Interpolitex 2011
- Type: Sniper rifle
- Place of origin: Austria

Service history
- Used by: See Users
- Wars: Syrian Civil War

Production history
- Manufacturer: Steyr Arms
- Produced: 2008–present
- Variants: SSG 08 M1

Specifications
- Mass: 12.125 lb (5.500 kg) (.308 Winchester, unloaded, without accessories); 13.25 lb (6.01 kg) (.338 Lapua Magnum, unloaded, without accessories)
- Length: 42.9 in (1,090 mm) stock unfolded, 34.2 in (870 mm) stock folded (20 in barrel); 46.5 in (1,180 mm) stock unfolded, 37.8 in (960 mm) stock folded (23.6 in barrel); 50.1 in (1,270 mm) stock unfolded, 41.4 in (1,050 mm) stock folded (27.2 in barrel)
- Barrel length: 20 in (510 mm); 23.6 in (600 mm); 27.2 in (690 mm)
- Cartridge: .243 Winchester.308 Winchester.300 Winchester Magnum.338 Lapua Magnum
- Action: Bolt-action
- Feed system: 10-round detachable box magazine (.243 Winchester, .308 Winchester); 8-round detachable box magazine (.300 Win Mag); 6-round detachable box magazine (.338 Lapua Magnum)
- Sights: 20 MOA Picatinny rail

The Steyr SSG 08 (German: Scharfschützengewehr 2008, lit. 'sharpshooter rifle [model] 08') is an Austrian bolt-action sniper rifle developed and produced by Steyr. The rifle is a further evolution of Steyr’s earlier SSG 04 sniper rifle.

== Design ==
It is a highly accurate bolt action sniper rifle, with a folding stock and an adjustable cheek piece and butt plate. It is equipped with a bipod and a "butt spike" monopod for added stability. The pistol grip is customisable by changing the front and back straps. The rifle has a Picatinny rail for mounting optics. The rifle also features an improved muzzle brake over the SSG 04, with the ability to attach a suppressor.

Introduced in 2008, Steyr claims EKO Cobra, Austria's primary counter-terrorism unit, had its hand in developing this weapon. The SSG 08 utilises the Safe Bolt System (SBS) action, cold hammer-forged barrels, trigger units and magazines of its parent, the SSG 04, but features an aluminium alloy stock, with side-folding, fully adjustable butt and additional Picatinny rails on the forend. The SSG 08 is advertised as capable of sub-MOA accuracy with proper ammunition.

The SSG 08 is based on Steyr's SBS rotary bolt action with four frontal locking lugs, arranged in pairs. It also features free-floated, cold hammer-forged heavy barrels, which are available in 20 inch (.308 Winchester), 23.6 inch (.243 Winchester, .308 Winchester, .300 Winchester Magnum) and 27.2 inch (.338 Lapua Magnum) lengths. Feed is from detachable double-column box magazines, which hold ten .243 Winchester or .308 Winchester, eight .300 Winchester Magnum or six .338 Lapua Magnum rounds. The single-stage trigger is factory set for optimum performance, but can be adjusted by the user. It is not equipped with iron sights.

== Users ==
- Armenia: Observed with Armenian Armed Forces snipers during Second Nagorno-Karabakh War.
- Austria: Used by Jagdkommando
- Azerbaijan: Used by Azerbaijani Special Forces and State Border Service (DSX)
- Croatia
- Germany
- Greece: Used by Hellenic Army snipers Steyr SSG M1 variant.
- Indonesia: Used by Indonesian National Police Mobile Brigade Corps (Brimob)
- Free Papua: Used by the Free Papua Movement, captured from Indonesian security forces
- Norway
- North Korea: Smuggled in or copies developed for Special Forces.
- Russia: Observed with Russian troops involved in the Syrian Civil War and in Ukraine. It has also been seen in use by the Russian FSO.
- Slovenia
- Turkey: Used by Police Special Operation Department.
