= Sky-Watch =

Danish UAV manufacturer

Sky-Watch A/S
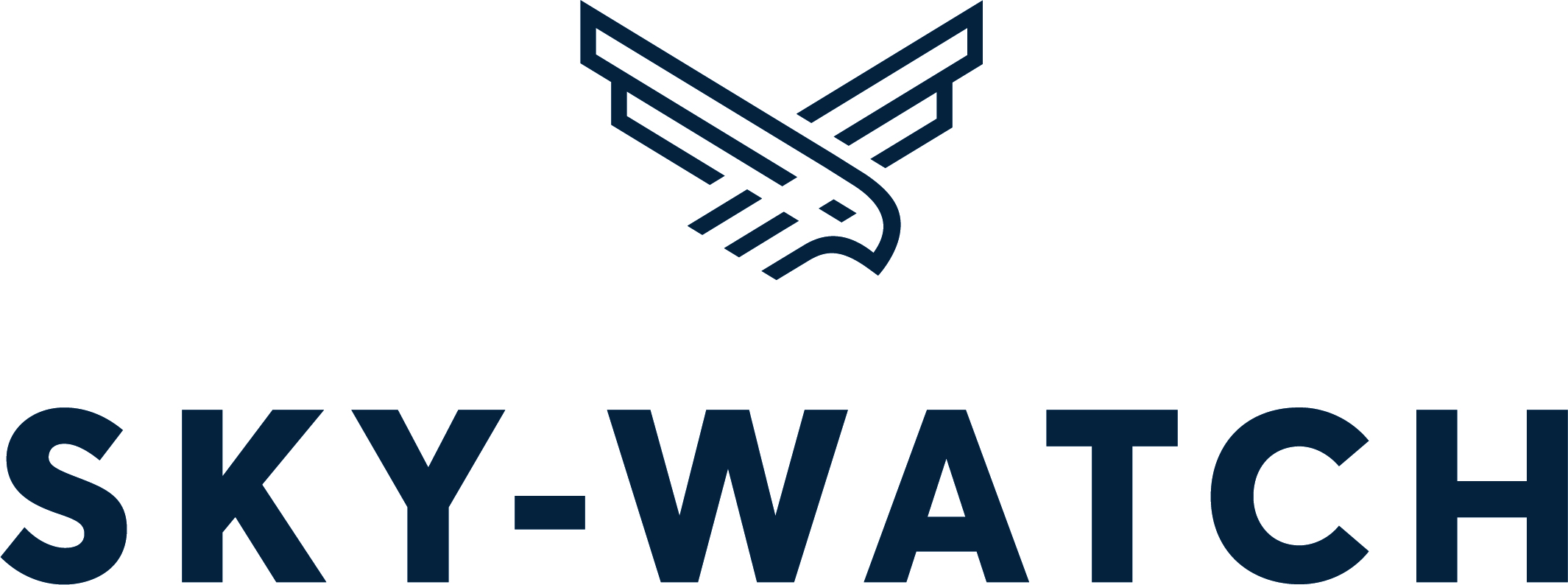
- Sky-Watch UAV manufacturer
- Type: Public company
- Founded: Støvring, Denmark (December 1, 2009)
- Founder: Jonas Dyhr Johansen
- Headquarters: Støvring, Denmark
- Area served: Worldwide
- Key people: Martin Schousboe (CEO) Henrik Voss (CTO) Thomas Bruun (Head of Marketing) Morten Kaalund (Head of Operations)
- Products: Unmanned aerial vehicles
- Number of employees: 30-40
- Website: www.sky-watch.dk

Sky-Watch A/S is a Danish developer and manufacturer of unmanned aerial vehicles (UAV). Founded in 2009, Sky-Watch is based in Støvring, Denmark.

In 2016 - Sky-Watch purchases the small startup company "Little Smart Things" in Nexø. And continues the Cumulus and Heidrun platforms.

== Products ==
Sky-Watch provides platforms with various configurations. Currently the platforms are:

- Huginn
- Heidrun
- Cumulus

Discontinued products:

- Huginn X1
- Huginn X1D

== Notable Uses ==
- In 2013 Sky-Watch provided a Huginn X1 quadcopter to the USAR teams deployed in the Philippines after the typhoon Haiyan raged over the islands.
