= Model 67 mine =

Austrian anti-tank mine

The Model 67 is a square plastic cased Austrian minimum metal anti-tank blast mine. The mines pressure fuze sits on the top of the mine, with a provision for an anti-handling device. A second version of the mine the ATM-75 is similar to the Model 67 mine.

== Specifications ==
- Diameter: 280 mm
- Width: 283 mm
- Weight: 8.3 kg
- Explosive content: 7.4 kg of TNT
