= Zalužani =

Zalužani Залужани (Serbian) Vladingrad
- Village (Selo)
- Location within Bosnia and Herzegovina
- Coordinates: 44°50′23″N 17°13′28″E
- Country: Bosnia and Herzegovina
- Entity: Republika Srpska
- Municipality: Banja Luka

Population (2013)
  - Total: 660
- Time zone: UTC+1 (CET)
  - Summer (DST): UTC+2 (CEST)

Zalužani (Serbian Cyrillic: Залужани) is a village in the municipality of Banja Luka, Republika Srpska, Bosnia and Herzegovina. The village is also home to Bosnia and Herzegovina's only motor racing track.

== Racing circuit ==
The circuit was opened in 1989 and modified in 1998 (turn 9 was reprofiled), shortening the track to 3.251 km. The track was updated again in 2008 which included resurfacing the track, as well as installing pitlane and tire barries to conform to safety regulations.

Over the years, the track hosted mainly local competitions and sometimes there is possibility to drive on the track with road car.
