= Kamaz (disambiguation) =

Kamaz or KAMAZ is a Russian manufacturer of trucks and engines.

Kamaz may also refer to:

- KAMAZ-7850, a new unified family of wheeled very heavy load transporters being developed by KAMAZ for the Russian Ministry of Defence
- KamAZ "Shuttle", a bus with the autopilot on electricity, jointly developed by the AERI and the Kama Automobile Plant
- Kamaz Typhoon, a family of Russian multi-functional, modular, armoured, mine-resistant MRAP vehicles
- Kamaz Master, Russian motorsport team

== See also ==
- List of Kamaz vehicles
- FC KAMAZ Naberezhnye Chelny, Russian football club
- KAMAZ Stadium, a multi-purpose stadium in Naberezhnye Chelny, Russia
