= MAZ-7917 =

Soviet/Russian transporter erector launcher

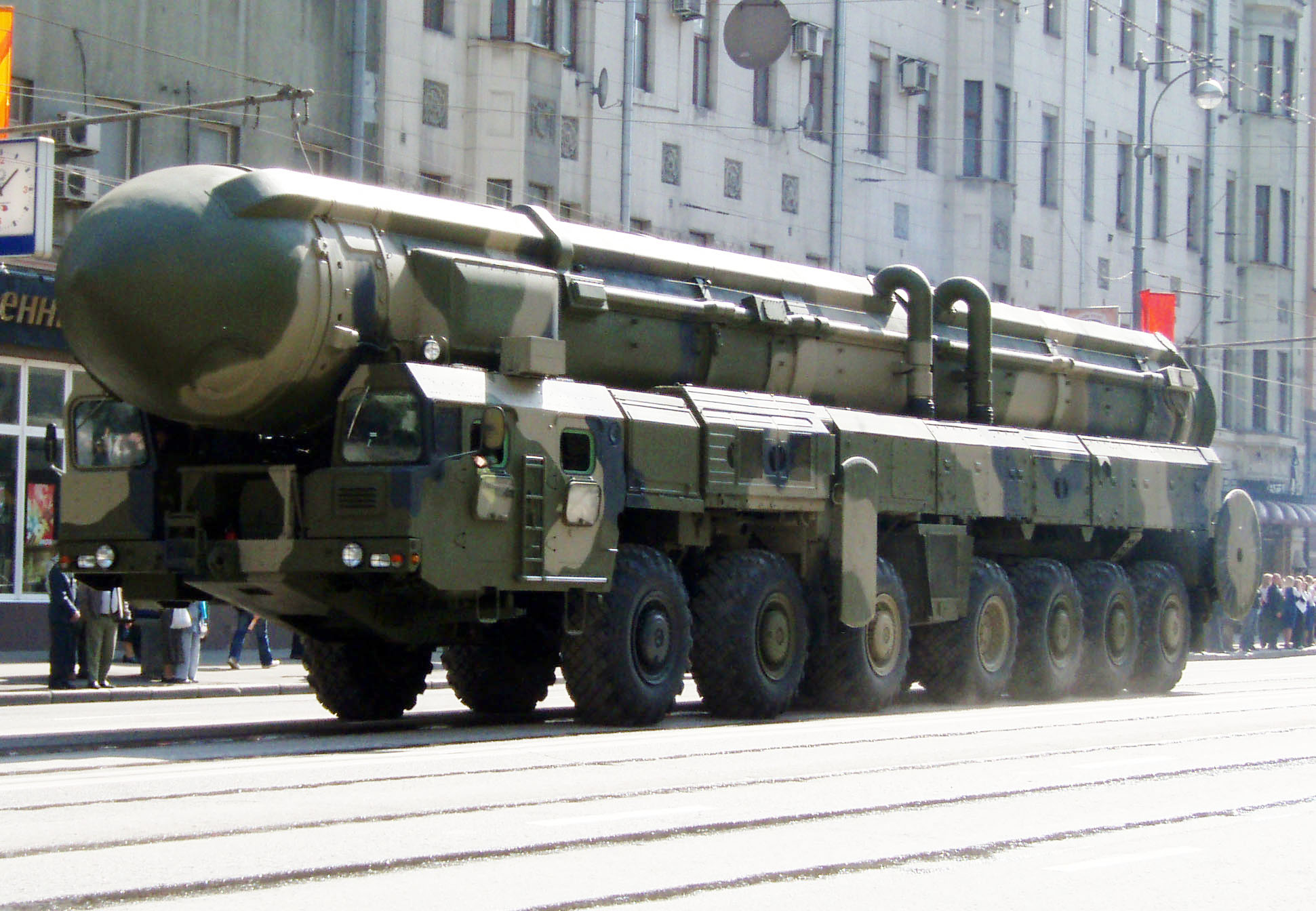
Topol vehicle in Moscow on Tverskaya Street for a 2008 Moscow Victory Parade rehearsal, May 5

The MAZ-7917 (Russian: МАЗ-7917) is a Soviet and Russian army 14×12 Twelve-wheel drive transporter-erector-launcher designed and developed by the Minsk Automobile Plant (MAZ) in Belarus.

Developed primarily for use as a Topol ICBM mobile launcher, the earlier MAZ-7912 is similar in design to the MAZ-547A but has seven axles instead of six (including one dead axle). In the mid-1980s, the MAZ-7917 variant was introduced, with an additional length of 1 m (3.3 ft) and crew cabins similar to the MAZ-7916 - and at present, the 8-axle MZKT-79221 variant is used to carry the Topol M, Topol's replacement.

== See also ==
- MAZ-7310
- KAMAZ-7850
