= KAMAZ-7850 =

Russian very-heavy transporter family

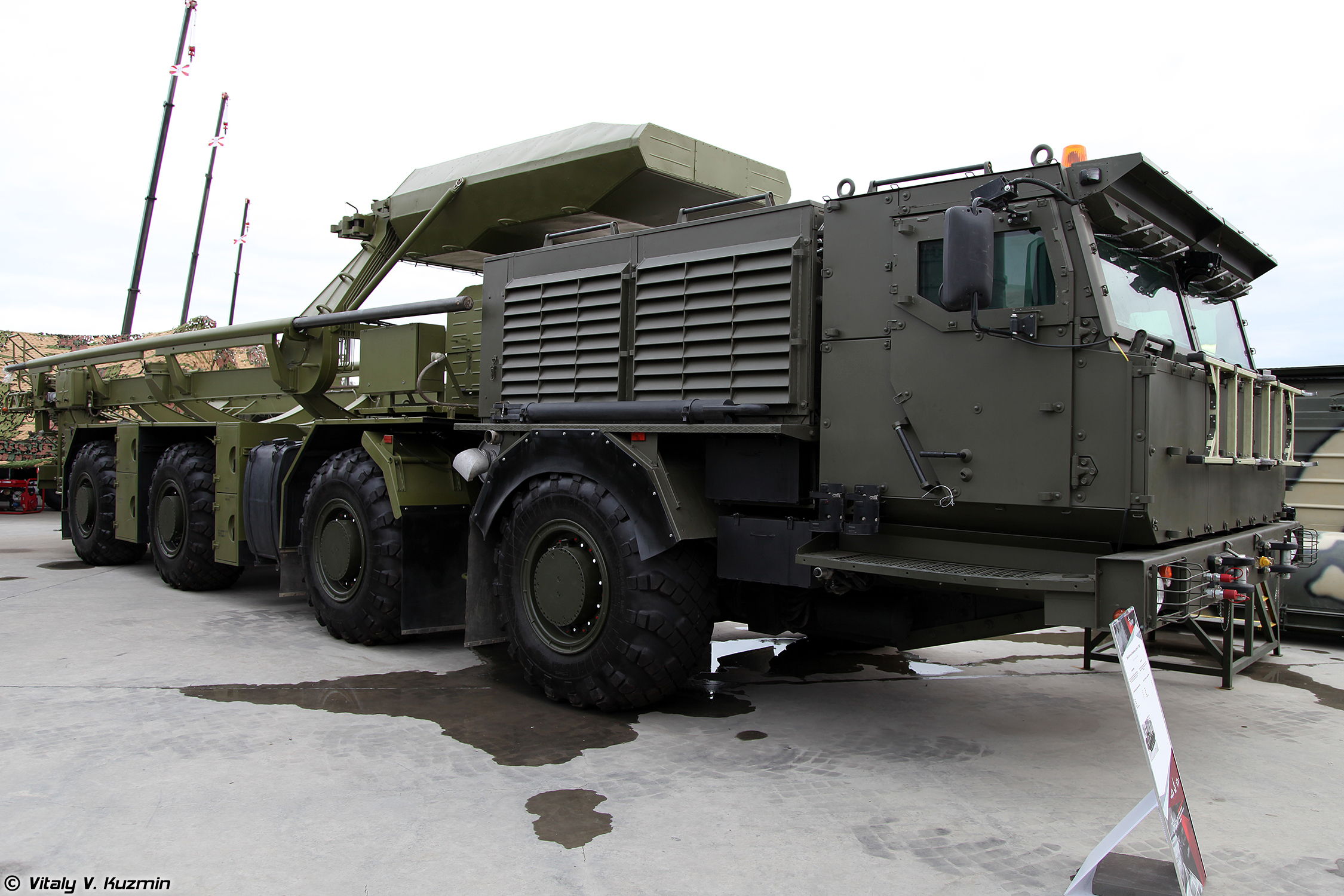
15T528 transporter-loader missile vehicle for ICBMs on KAMAZ-78501 Platforma-O chassis

The KAMAZ-7850 (Platforma-O) is a new unified family of very heavy load wheeled transporters developed by KAMAZ for the Russian Ministry of Defence. This family is designed to replace the Belarusian-made MZKT transporter erector launchers that currently carry Russian ICBMs.

The Platforma-O family includes several vehicles: KAMAZ-7850 16x16: Has a capacity of 85 tons. KAMAZ-78509 12x12: Capable of carrying 60 tons. KAMAZ-78504 8x8: Can tow a 90-ton semi-trailer. KAMAZ-78508 8x8: Used for transporting aircraft on airfields.

One of the primary applications of these vehicles will be carrying RS-24 Yars missiles.

State tests of the Platforma-O family were completed in August 2018, and it entered service in March 2019. The Russian military is set to receive five versions of the vehicle: - 8x8: Payload capacity of 25 tons.

- 12x12: Payload capacity of 50 tons.

- 16x16: Payload capacity of 85 tons.

- 8x8 semi-trailer: Towing capacity of 165 tons.

- 8x8 ballast tractor: Towing capacity of 400 tons.

The 12x12 and 16x16 tractors will be used as transporter erector launchers, while the other vehicles will carry various support systems.

== See also ==
- List of Kamaz vehicles
- MAZ-7917
- MAZ-7310
- MZKT-79221
