= MZKT-79221 =

Russian military vehicle

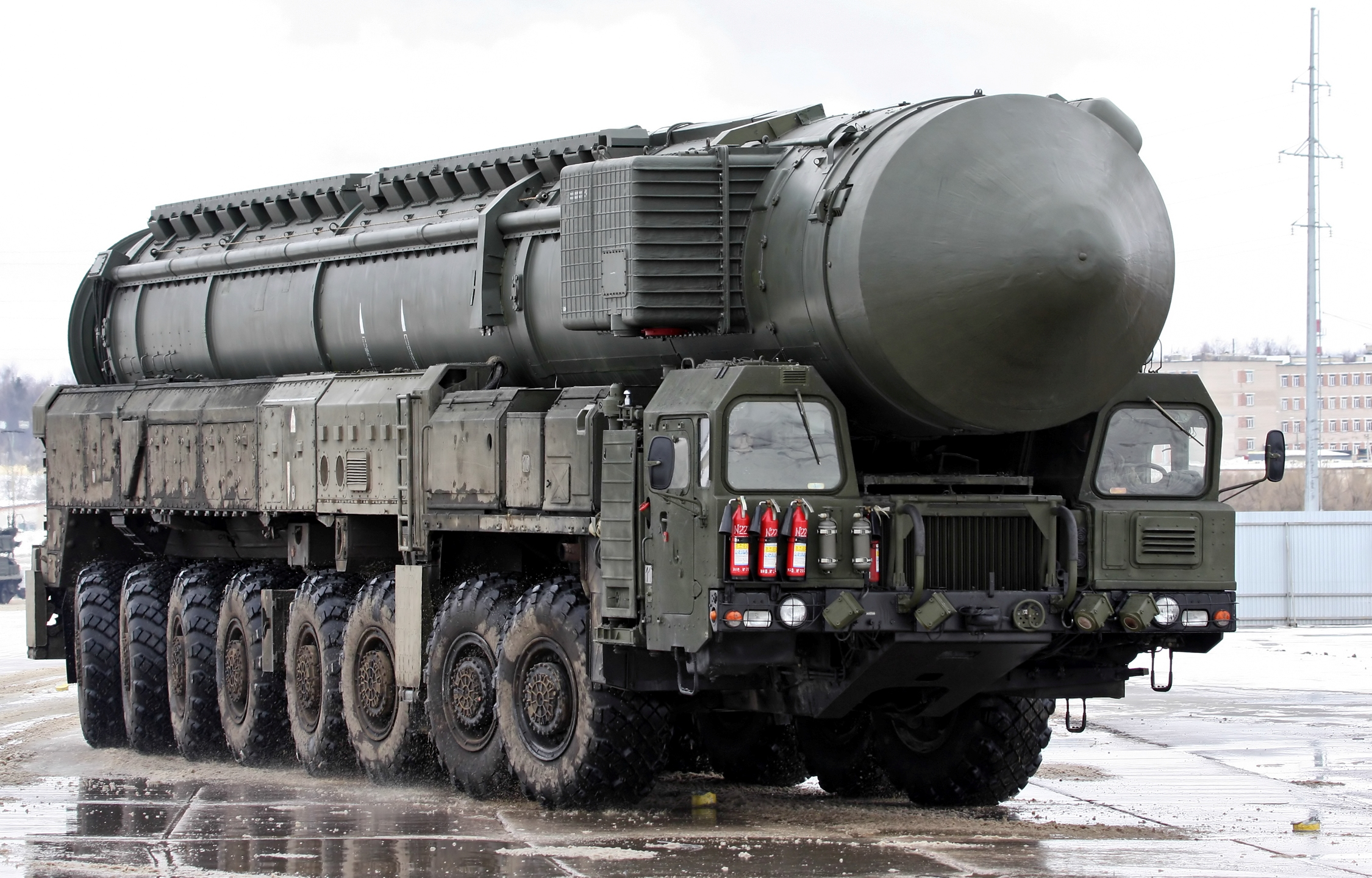
RT-2PM2 Topol-M

The MZKT-79221 (Russian: МЗКТ-79221) is a Russian army 16x16 transporter-erector-launcher (TEL) designed and developed by the MZKT in Belarus. It was developed in the years 1996-1997, and serial production began in 2000.

Developed primarily for use as a RT-2PM2 Topol-M TEL, the 79221 model is similar to the MAZ-7917 but has eight axles instead of seven. It is powered by a YaMZ-847.1 (800 horsepower) V12 diesel engine.

== See also ==
- MAZ-7310
- KAMAZ-7850
