= Missile vehicle =

Vehicle used to transport missiles and rocket artillery

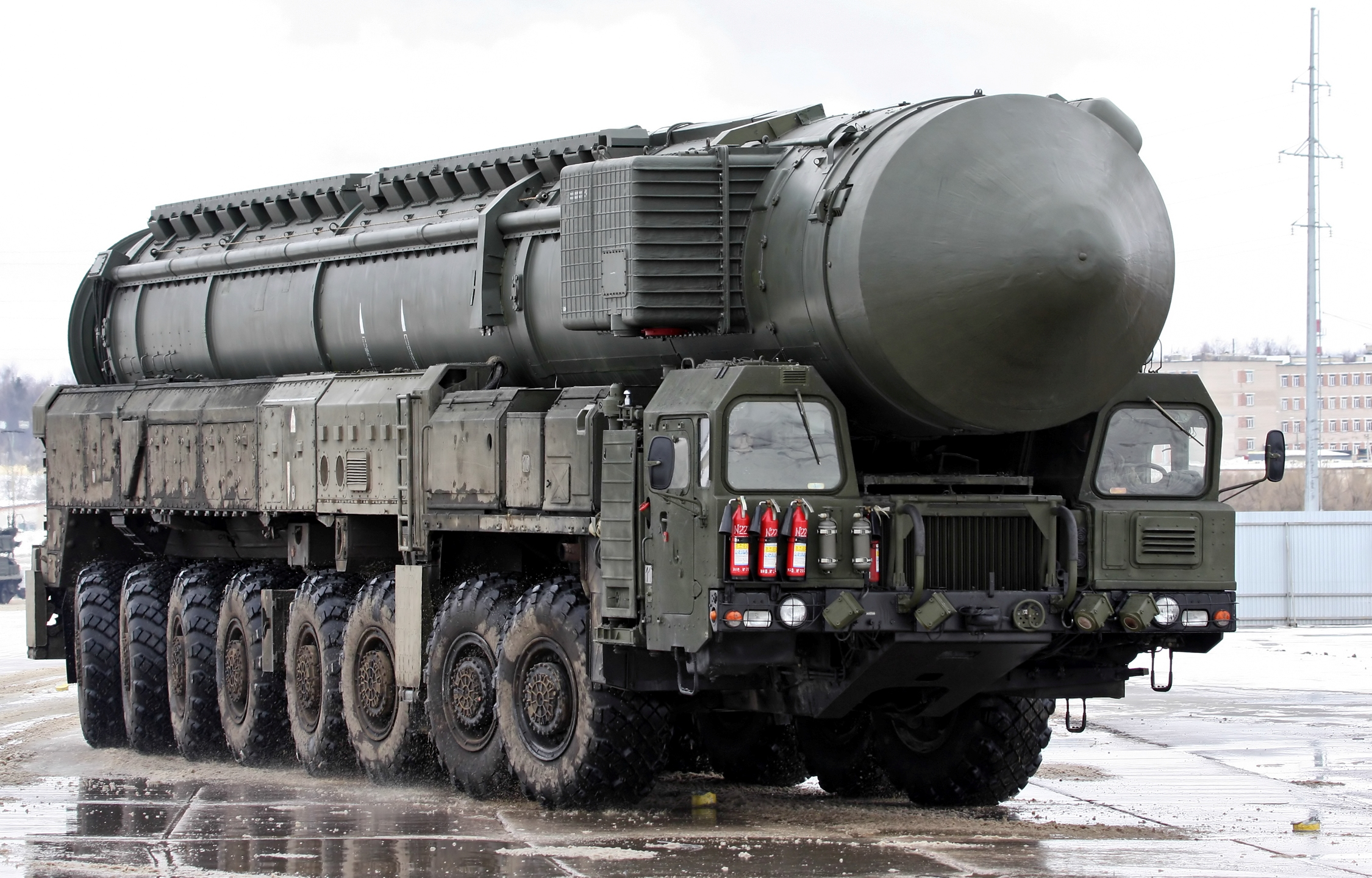
A Russian Strategic Rocket Forces MZKT-79221 missile vehicle carrying an RT-2PM2 Topol-M intercontinental ballistic missile

A missile vehicle, also known as a missile carrier, missile truck, or (if capable of launching) missile launcher vehicle, is a military vehicle that is purpose-built and designed to carry missiles, either for safe transportation or for launching missiles in combat. Missile vehicles include transporter erector launchers (TEL) and multiple rocket launchers (MRL).

The missile vehicle may be self-propelled, or the missile launcher may be on a trailer towed by a truck or prime mover. Long missiles are commonly transported parallel to the ground on these vehicles, and then elevated into an inclined or vertical position for launching. Single or dual missile vehicles often transport their missiles uncovered. The missile batteries of multiple rocket launchers often hold their missiles inside tubular or rectangular canisters for each missile, from which the missiles or rockets can be launched (or fired, in other words). Many missile trucks use large pneumatic tires, though some use continuous tracks.

== History ==
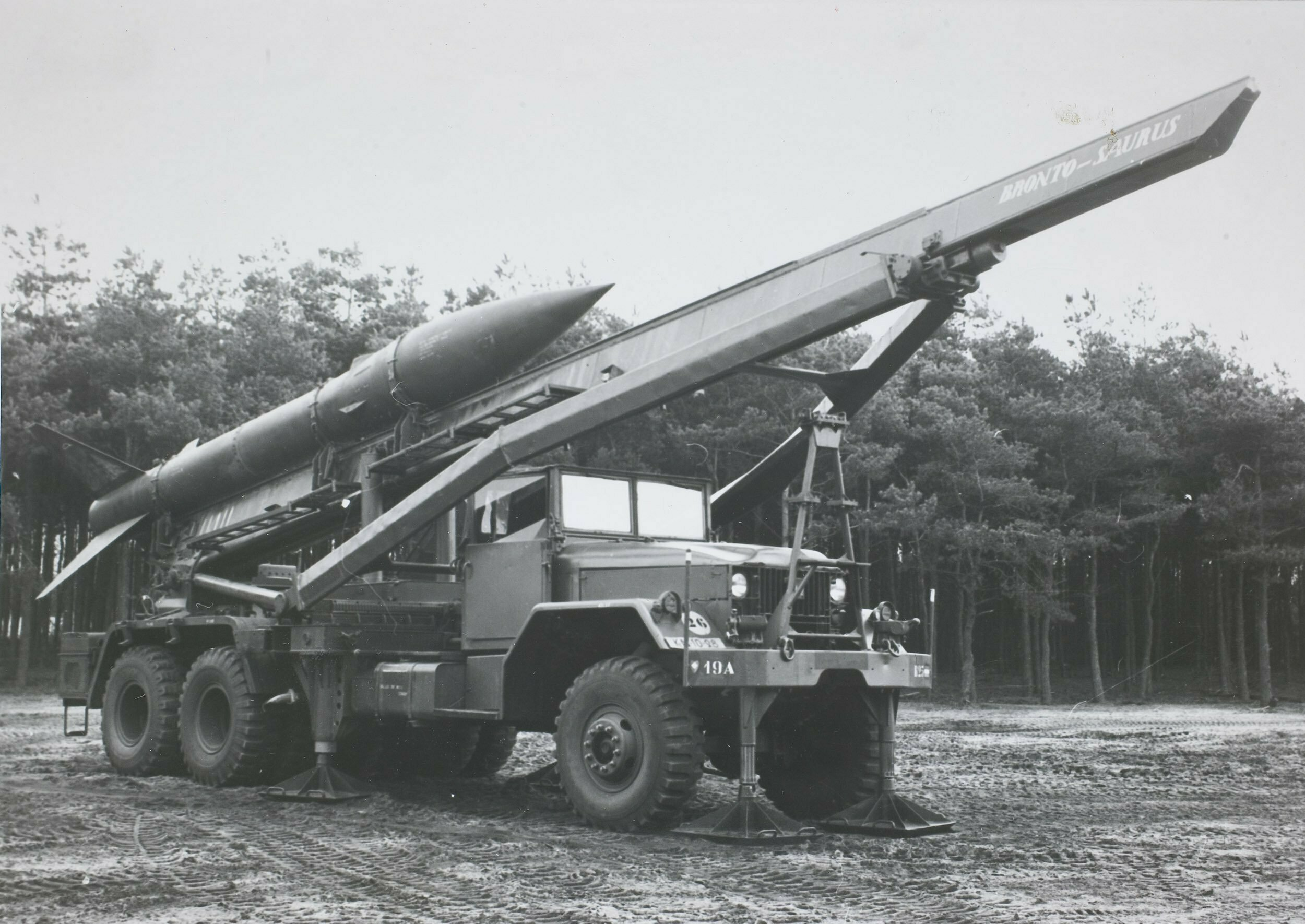
A United States Army M139D 5-ton 6×6 missile vehicle carrying an MGR-1 Honest John

The Katyusha rocket launcher was an early launcher mostly mounted on missile trucks used by the Soviet Union during World War II. In turn, the United States produced the T34 Calliope missile-launching vehicle in limited quantities by attaching a multiple-missile battery atop an M4 Sherman.

Among the largest missile vehicles are the multi-wheeled (tires) 8-axle MZKT-79221 carrying vehicles for Topol-M ICBMs as the Russian Ground Forces' longest trucks. As of December 2008, there are six such road-mobile missile systems. Another Russian example is the truck for the Pechora-2M Surface-to-Air Anti-aircraft missile system, which can transport and launch two missiles, and also used by some other countries.

American examples of single-missile launcher trucks include the various missile launcher variants of the M39 series 5-ton 6×6 truck. In these trucks, after transporting the missile, the missile-launching mechanism with the missile on it is pivoted upwards to put it into position for launching. Some trucks carry a battery containing four Harpoon or Patriot missiles for launching. These multiple missile batteries are also pivoted upwards for launching and the launcher in some cases can be rotated around on the chassis (or platform) of the truck. To prepare for launching operations, outriggers are extended from the truck and placed on the ground to stabilize the truck from a recoil reaction during a missile launch.

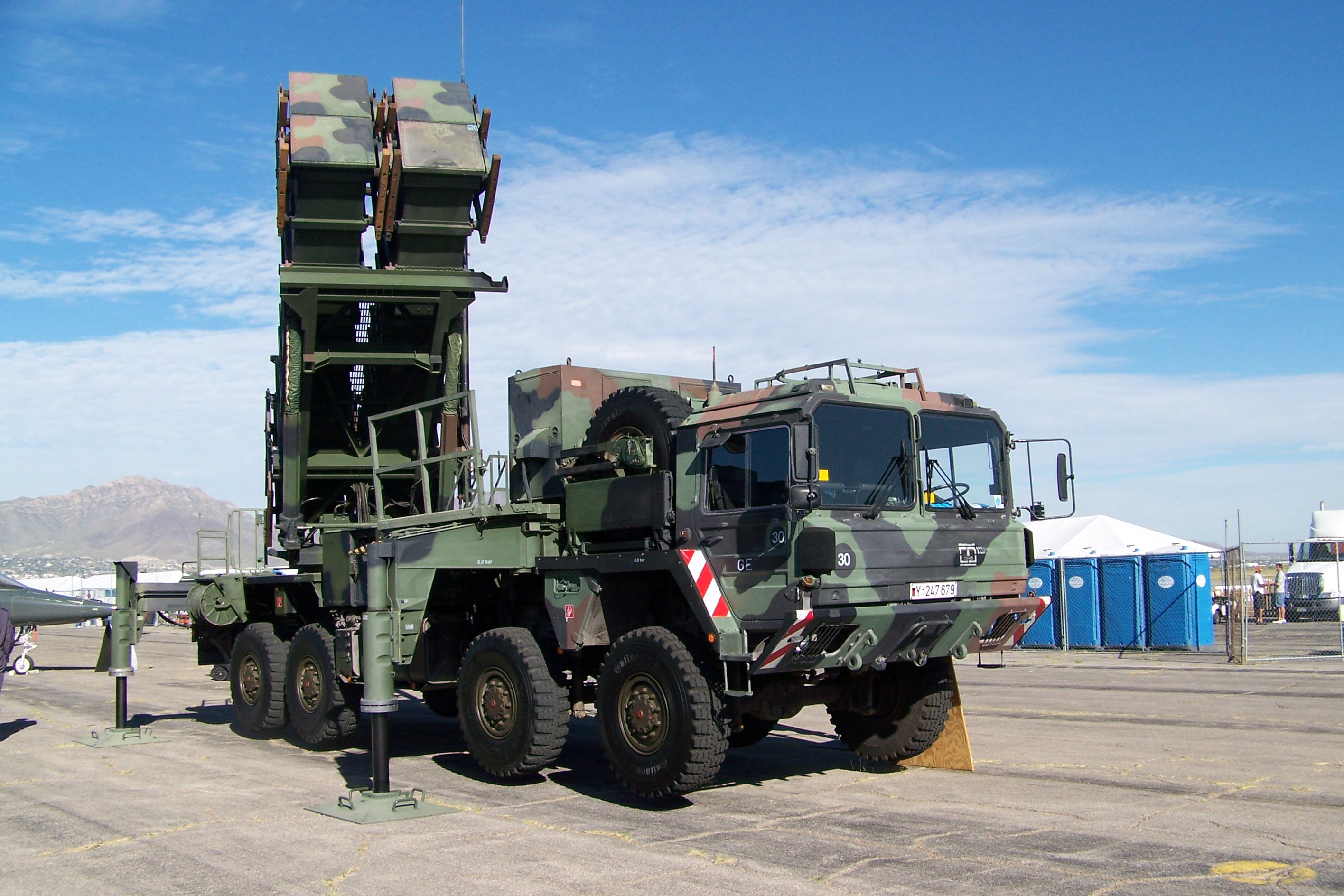
German MAN KAT A1 with Patriot missile launcher. Note outriggers at side and rear extended for launching.

The M270 Multiple Launch Rocket System, used in the United States and several other countries, uses a tractor crawler drive instead of conventional pneumatic tires. An example of a single-missile vehicle with a tractor crawler drive is the French Pluton missile launcher, based on the AMX-30 tank. The 2K11 Krug is a Soviet/Russian two-missile transporter erector launcher with a tractor crawler drive. The Russians also have rather extensive S-300 missile systems on various vehicles. Other examples of Soviet MRLs include the BM-21 Grad, BM-27 Uragan, and BM-30 Smerch, which use pneumatic tires and tubular missile canisters and are also used by various other countries. A Soviet-produced 9K52 Luna-M missile system uses a 9P113 single-missile TEL with pneumatic tires to transport an uncovered Soviet 9M21 missile.

American missile vehicles include the M1134 anti-tank guided missile vehicle from the Stryker family of military vehicles (with pneumatic tires and smaller BGM-71 TOW missiles), MIM-72 Chaparral (with tractor crawler drive and four exposed missiles), and AN/TWQ-1 Avenger (with pneumatic tires and anti-aircraft missile canisters) systems. The 'Long Range Surveillance and Attack Vehicle' produced by Lockheed Martin is an armored vehicle with four large pneumatic tires on each side and is able to fire missiles from its rotatable turret on top of the vehicle.

The initially Soviet then Russian family of S-300 missile systems has been upgraded by the Russian military to the current S-400 Triumf missiles and their carrier vehicles and put into service starting in 2007. The launch tubes with their S-400 missiles inside are transported horizontally (see photo in gallery below), and the battery of launch tubes with missiles are moved into a vertical position for launching with the launch tube bottoms on the ground.

Missile vehicles commonly take part in military parades, where they are used to publicly display a military's missile capabilities, nuclear weapons, or new missile technology. In the former Soviet Union and now in Russia, missile vehicles commonly appear in Victory Day Parades in Moscow's Red Square.

== Gallery ==
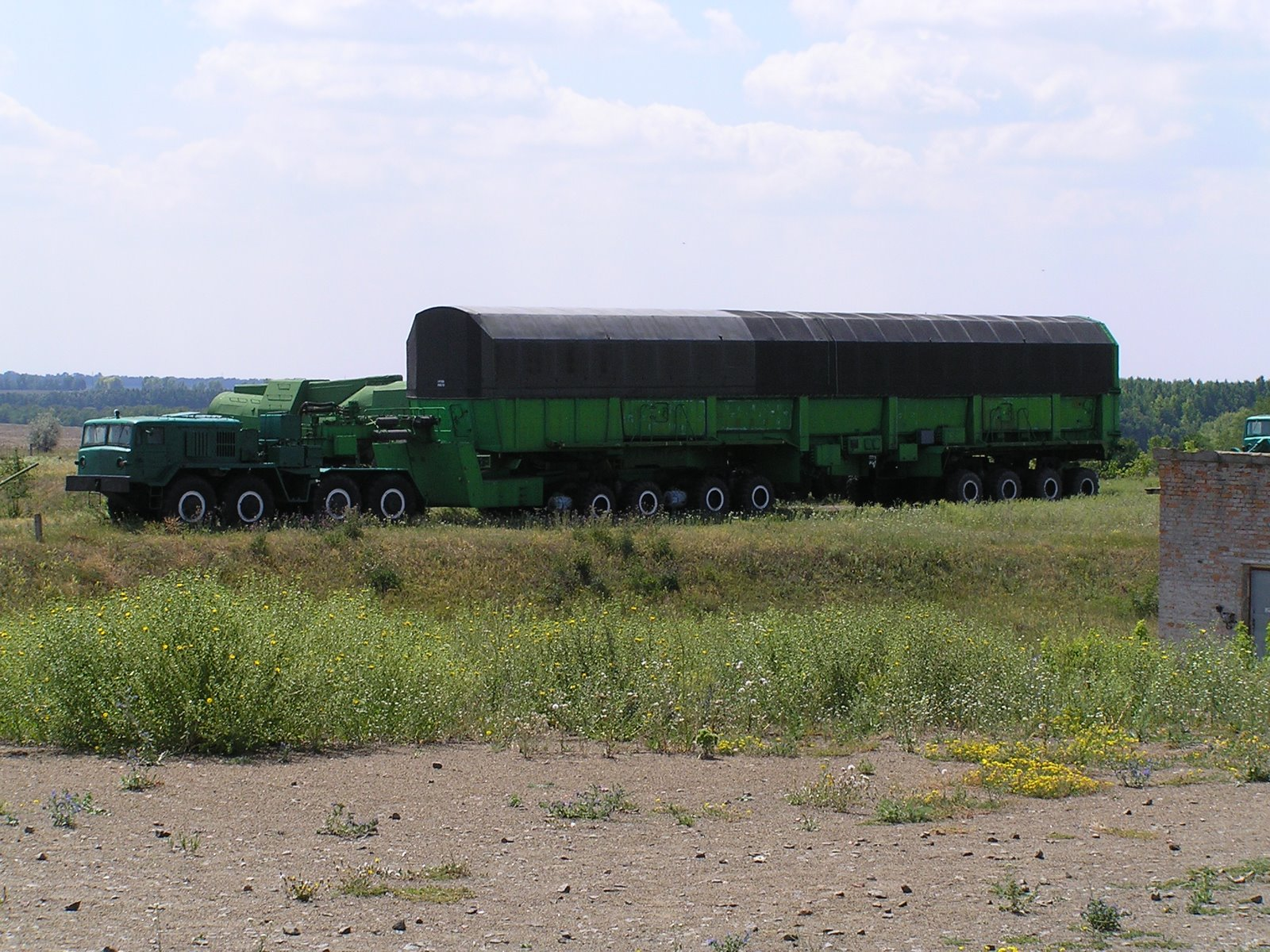
MAZ-537 with a special missile container at the Strategic Missile Forces Museum in Ukraine

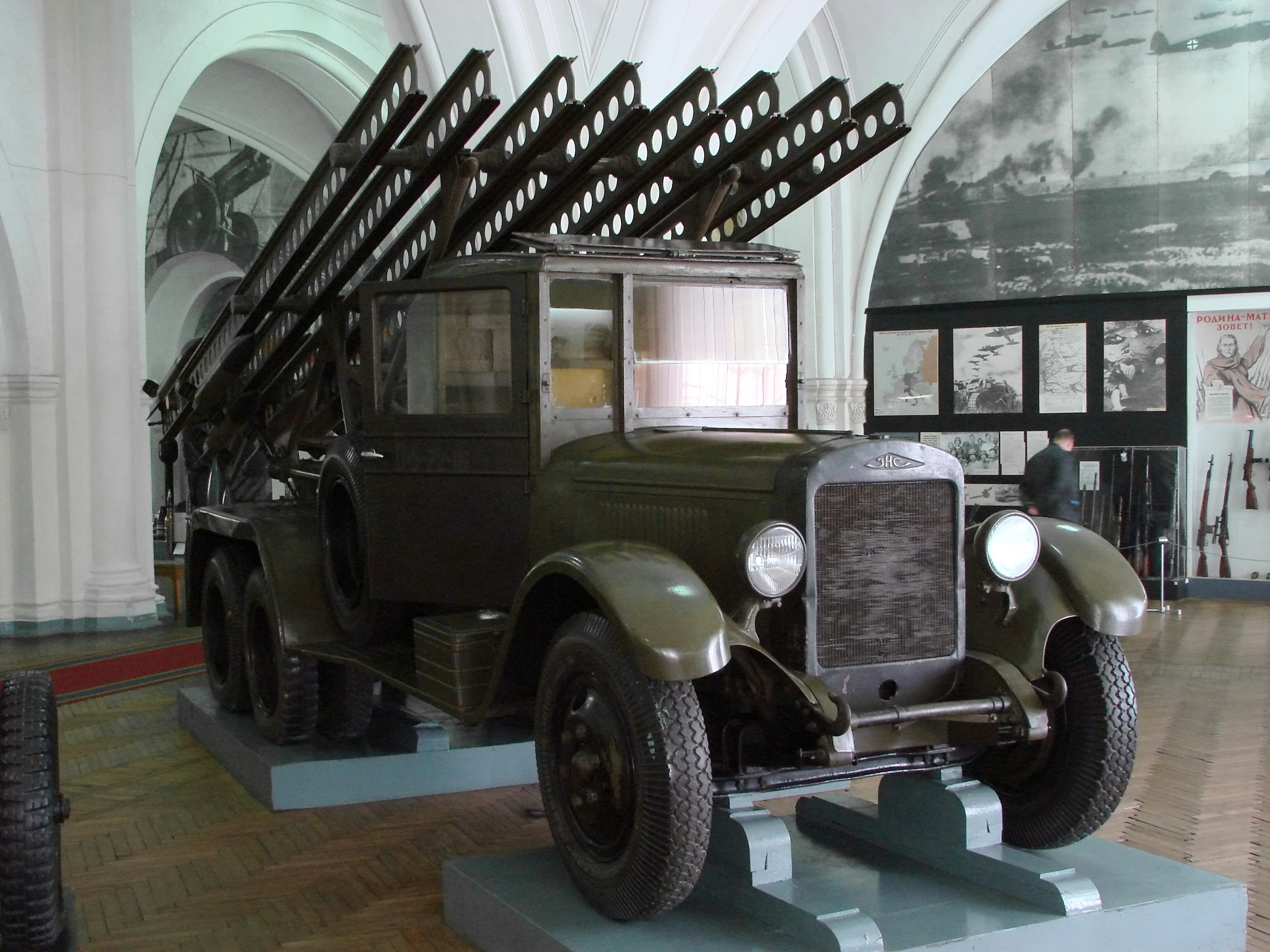
Soviet Katyusha rocket launcher on truck used in World War II

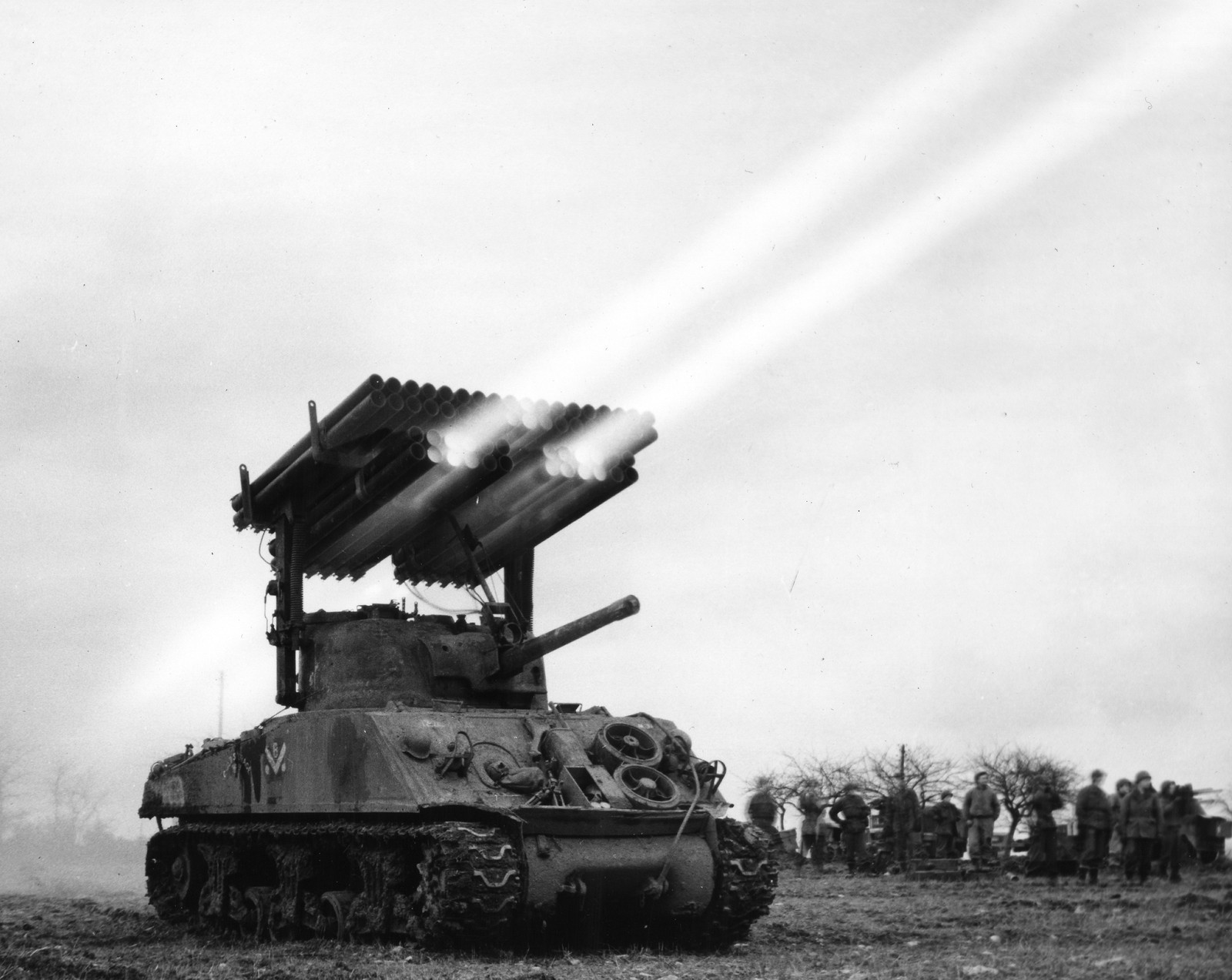
American T34 Calliope, a multiple-rocket launcher installed atop a tank, used in World War II

Peruvian missile truck with dual S-125 Pechora missiles

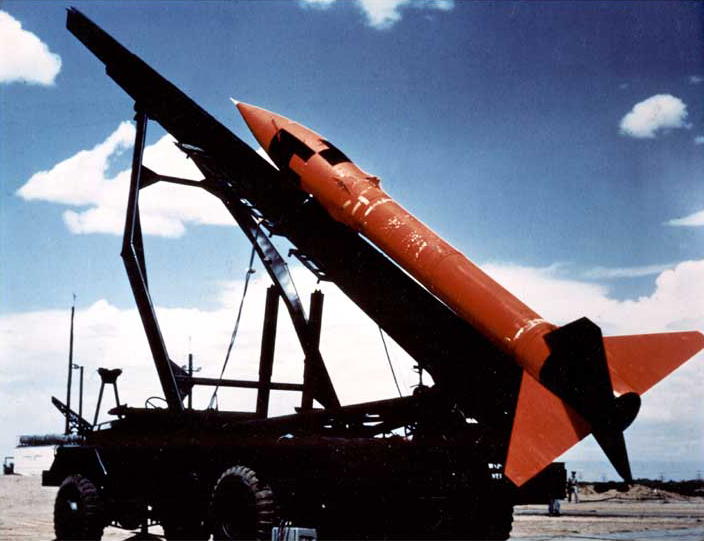
M289 MGR-1 Honest John Launcher Truck

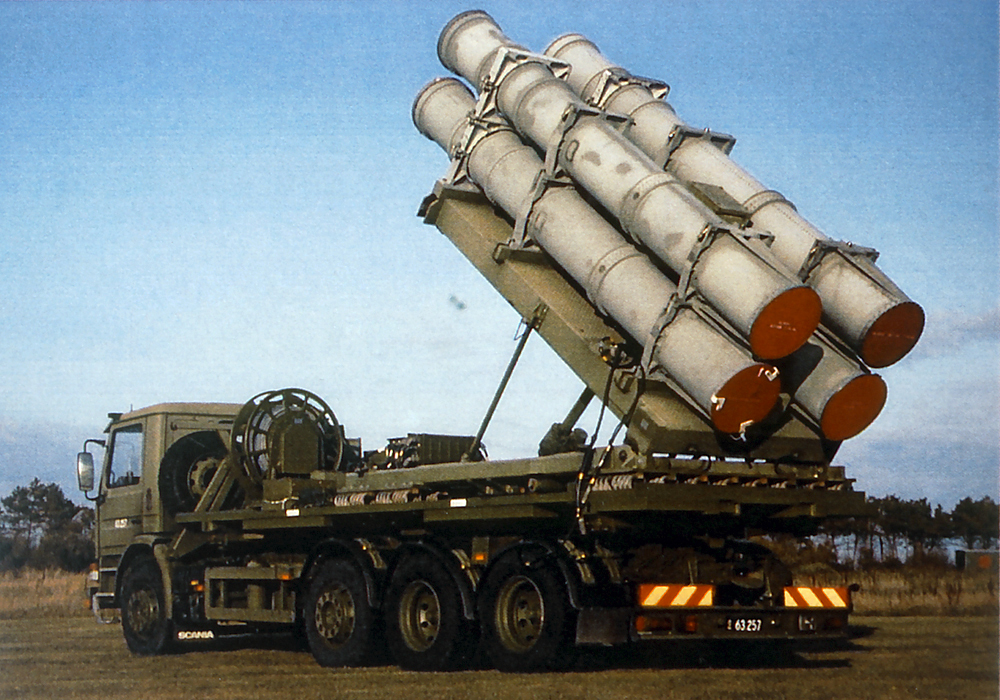
Danish mobile missile battery for holding four Harpoon missiles

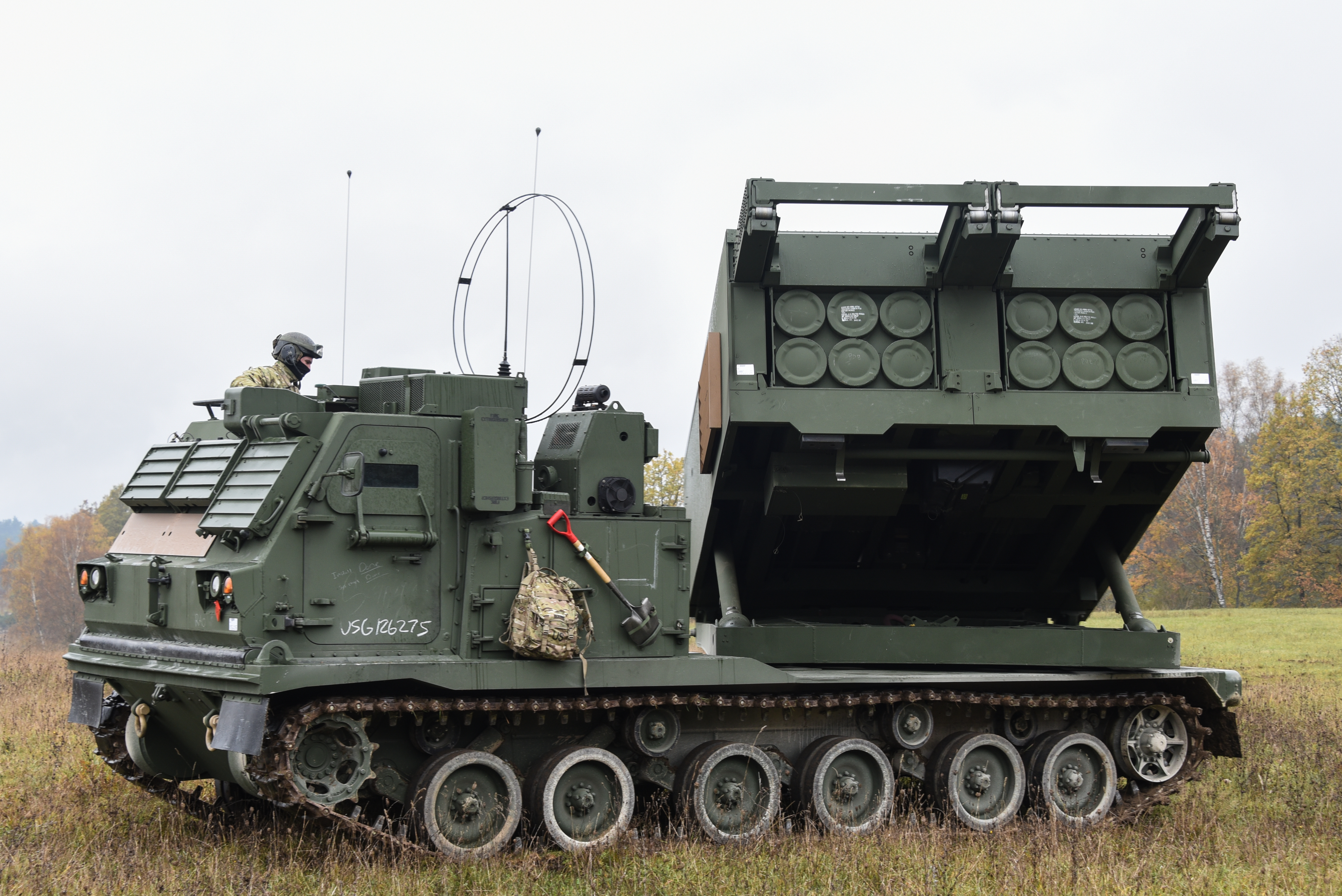
The M270 Multiple Launch Rocket System uses a tractor crawler drive.

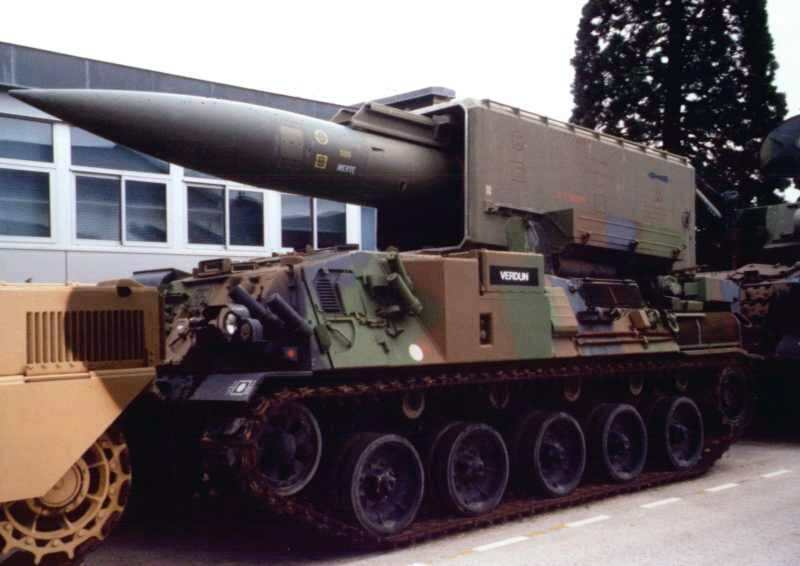
Pluton missile launcher, based on the AMX-30 tank

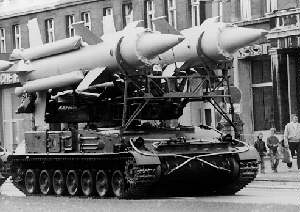
2K11 Krug two-missile TEL

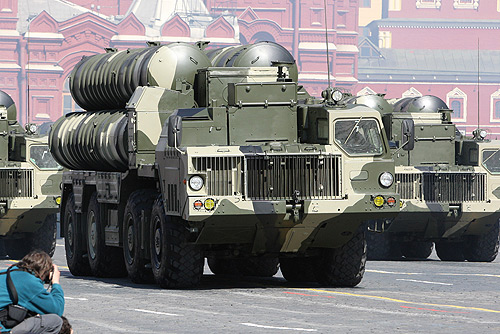
S-300 missile vehicle

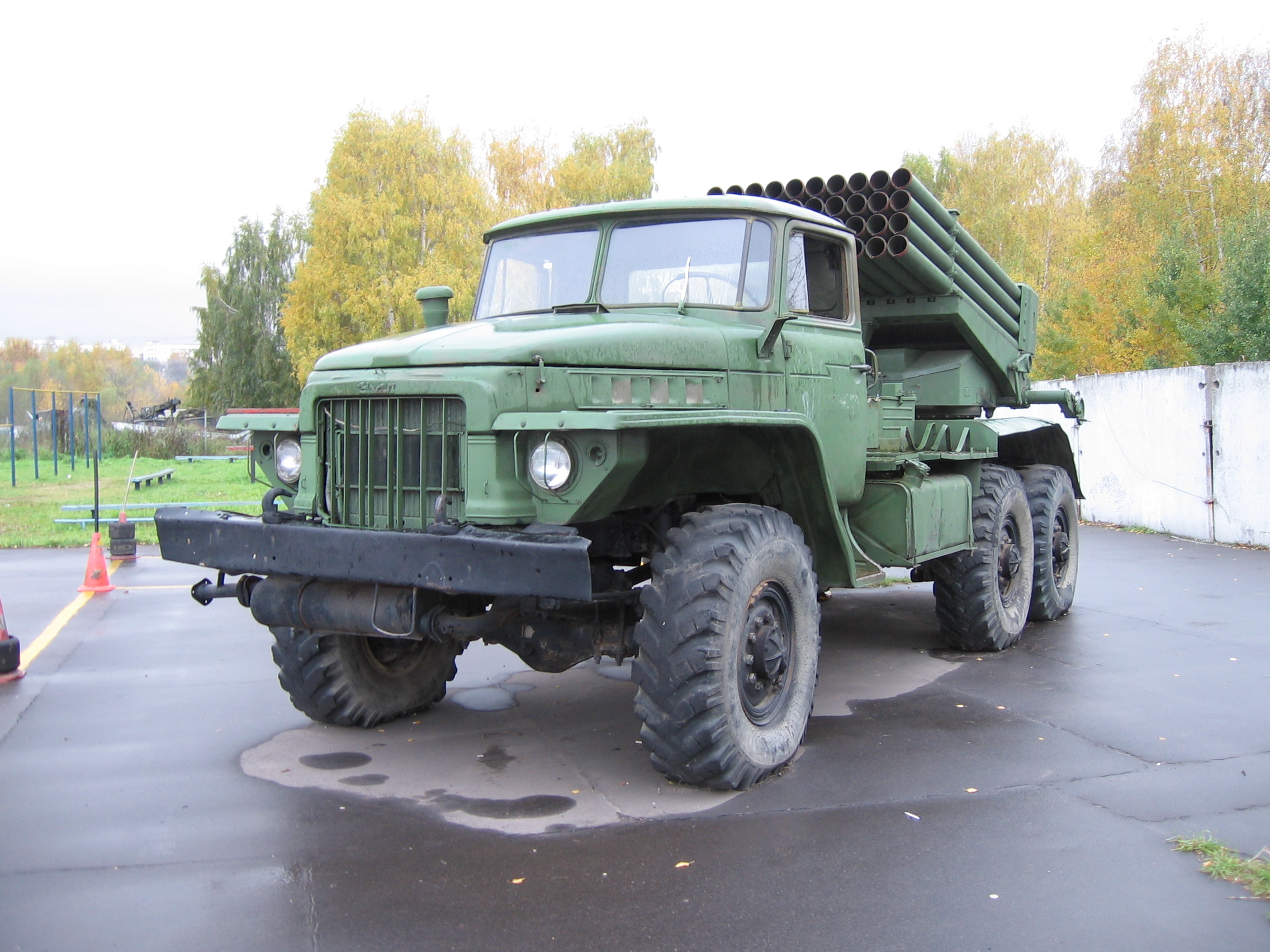
BM-21 Grad multiple rocket launcher

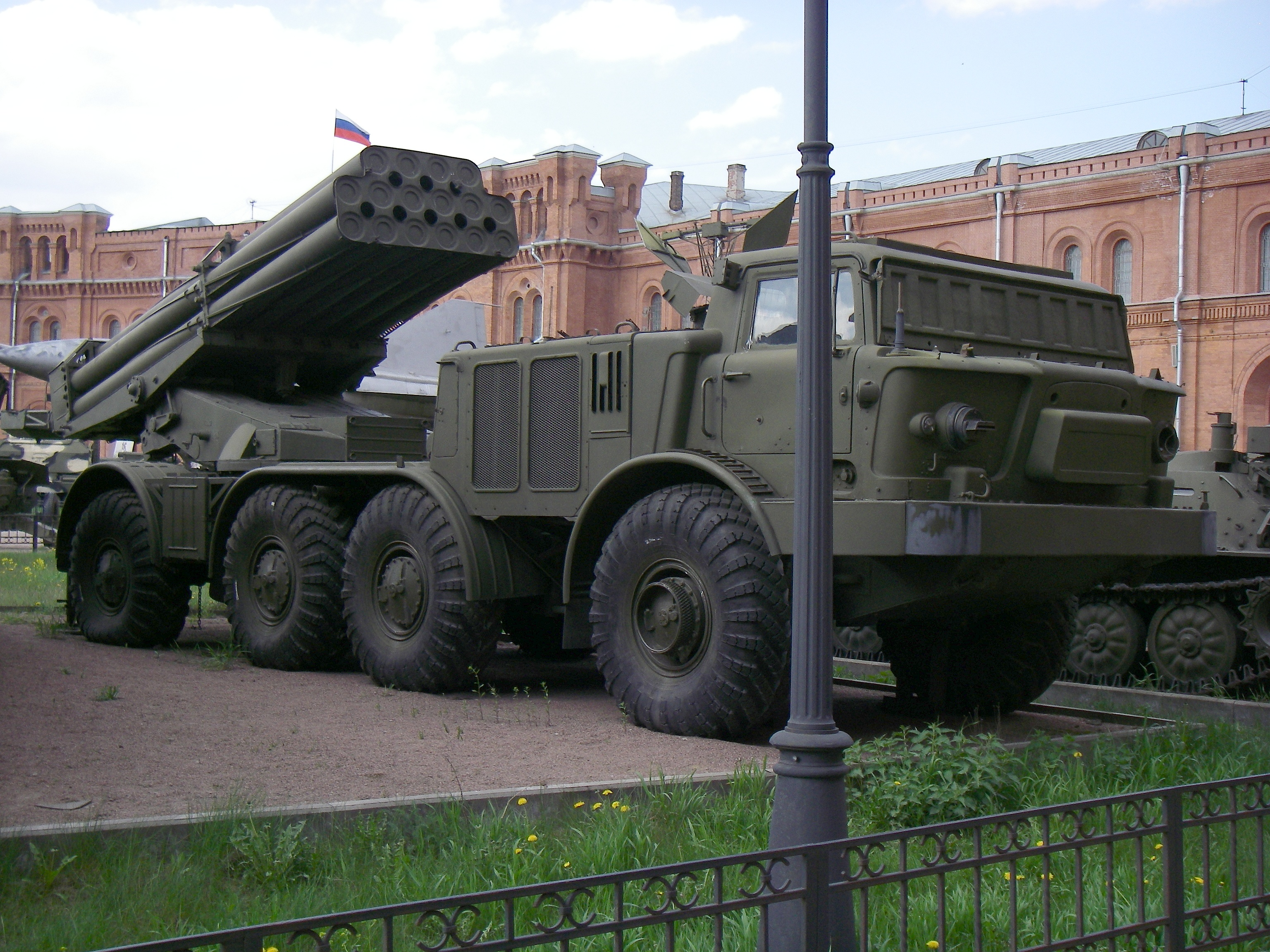
BM-27 Uragan multiple rocket launcher

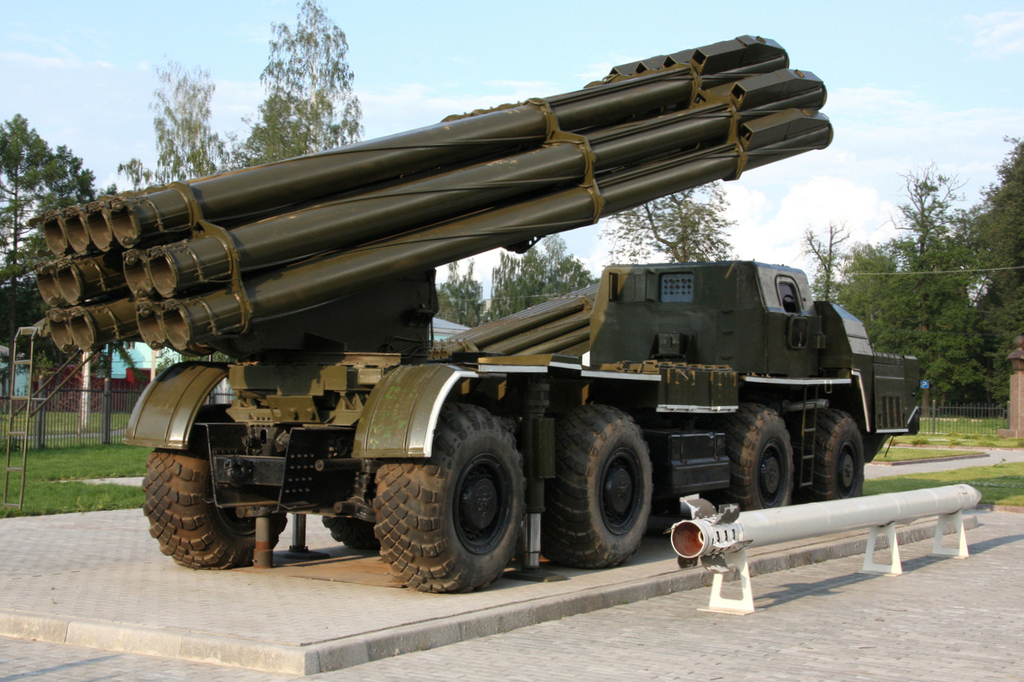
BM-30 Smerch multiple rocket launcher

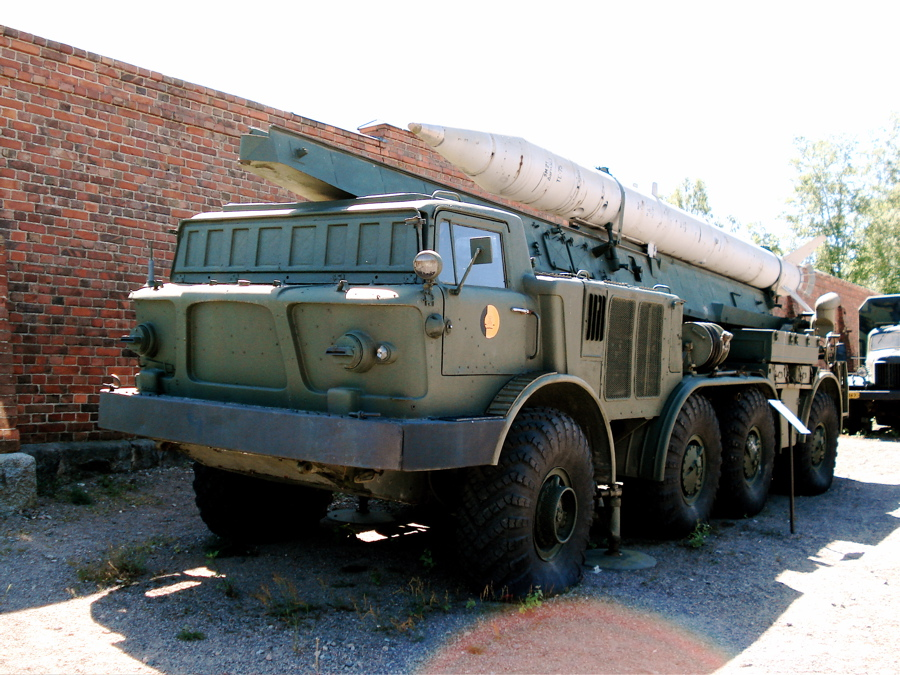
9K52 Luna-M missile system

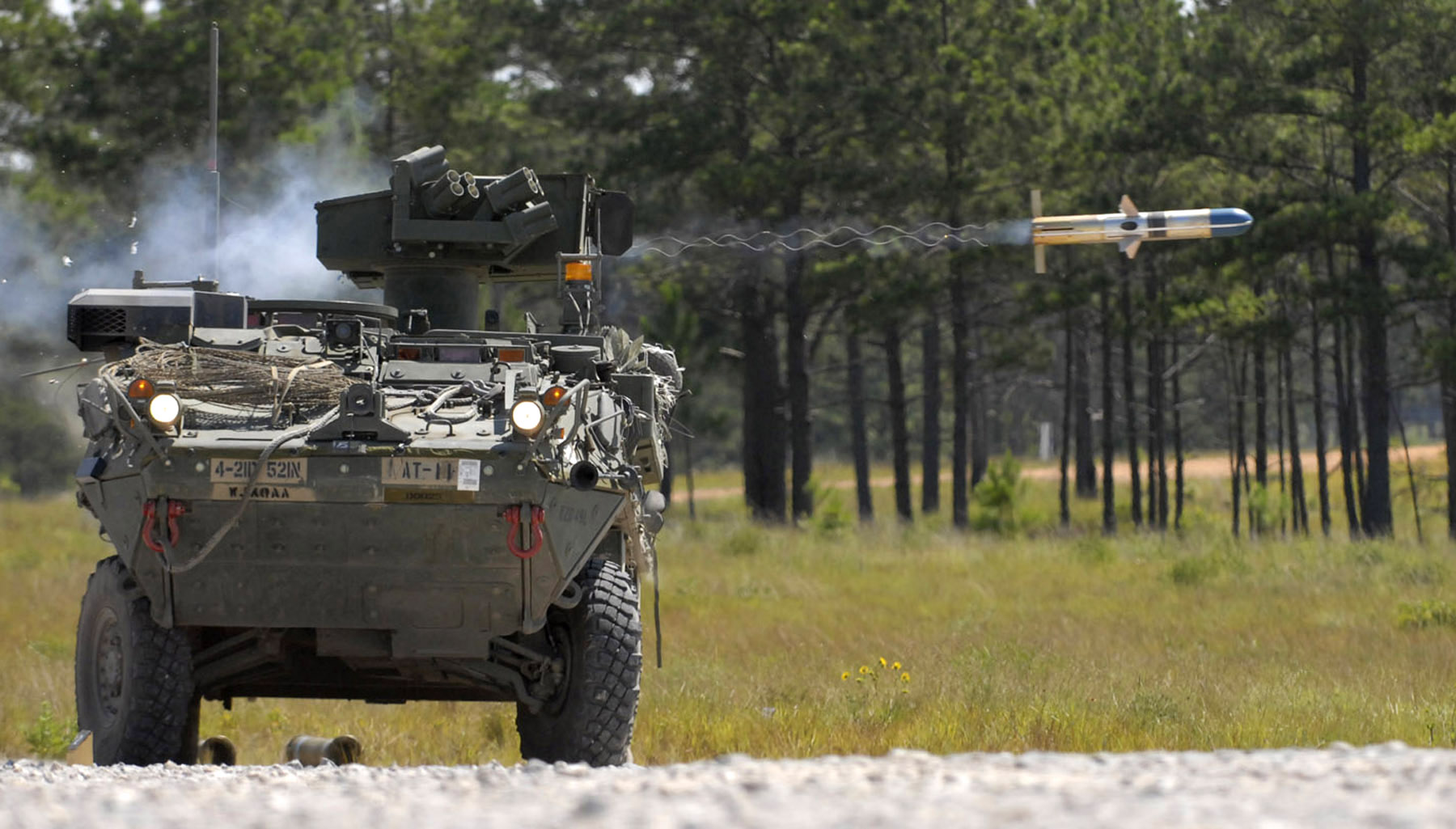
M1134 anti-tank guided missile vehicle fires a BGM-71 TOW missile.

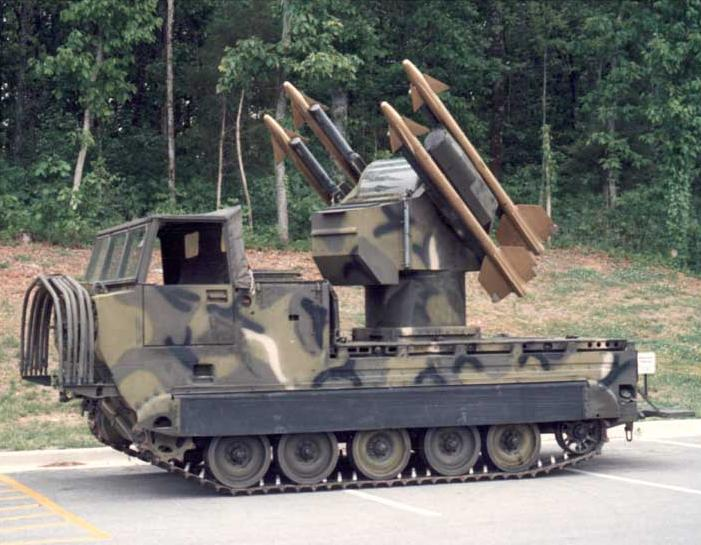
MIM-72 Chaparral with four uncovered missiles and a tractor crawler drive

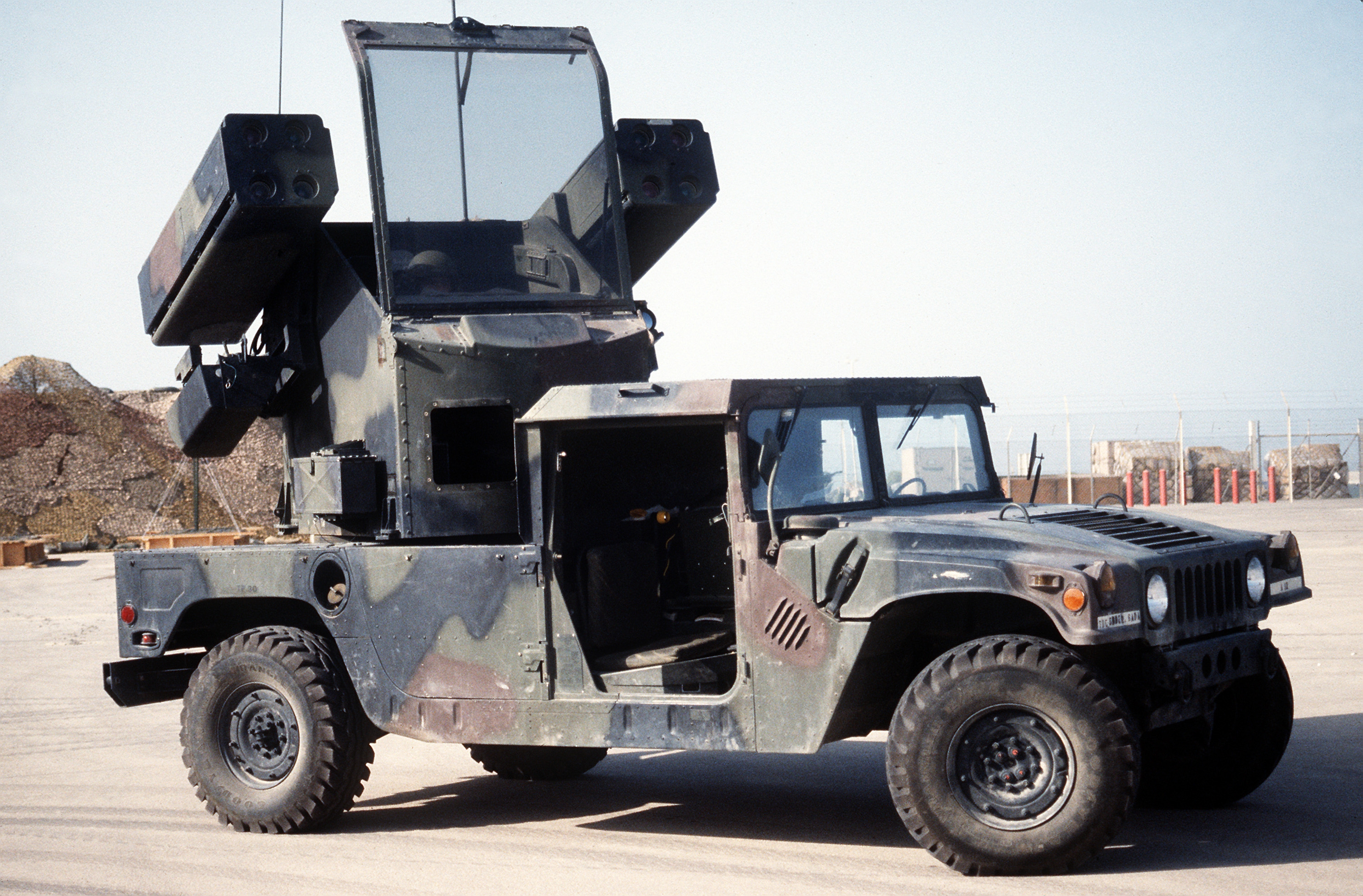
AN/TWQ-1 Avenger Air Defense System

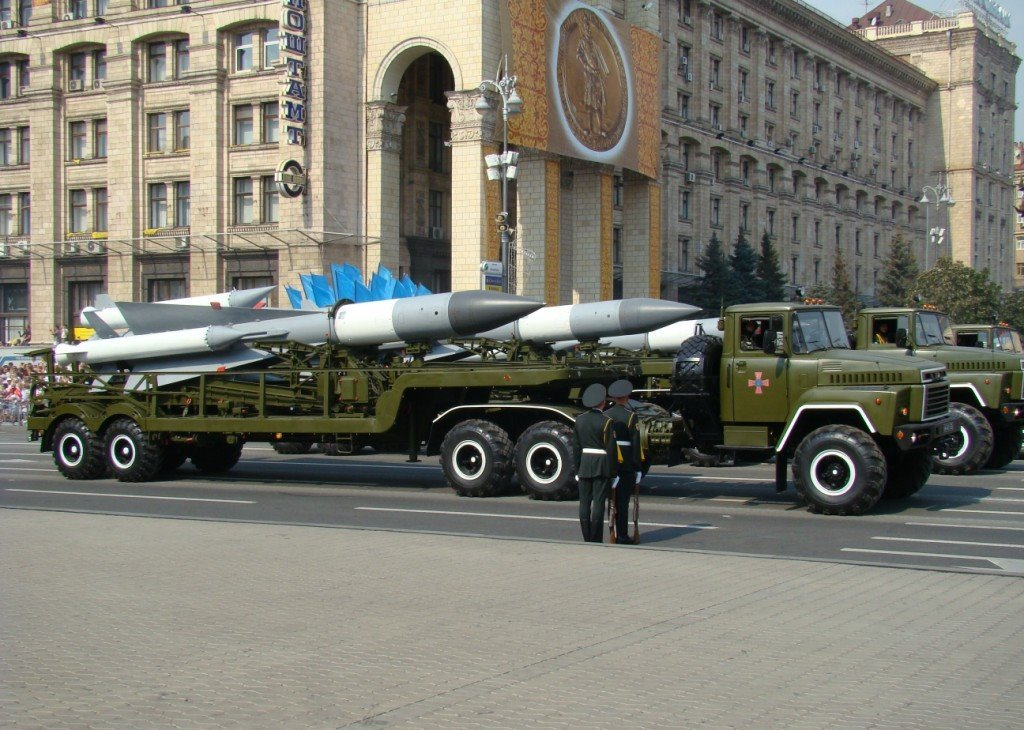
KrAZ trucks with S-200 missiles in Ukraine

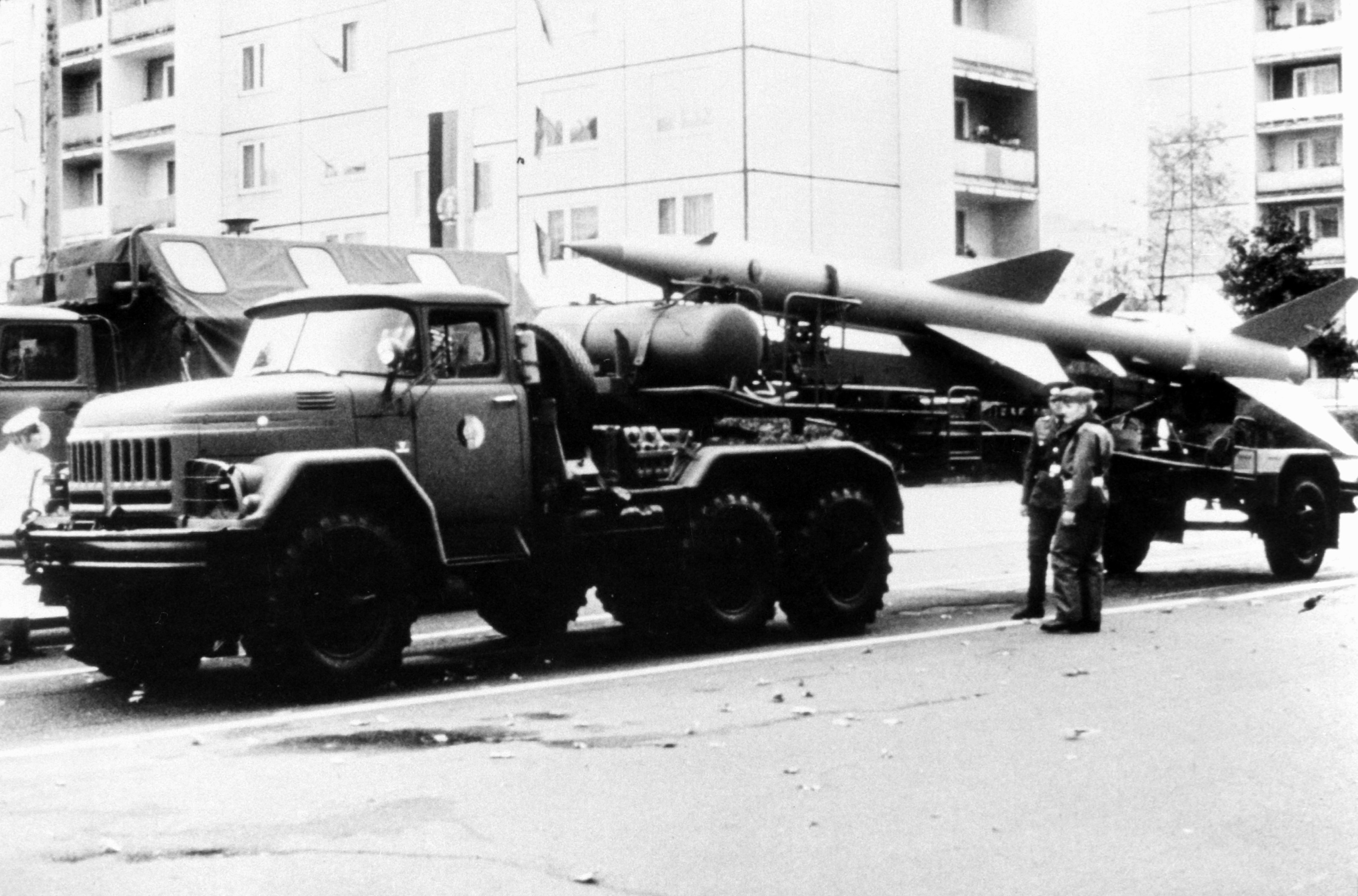
S-75 Dvina missile on a ZIL-131 truck of the East German Army

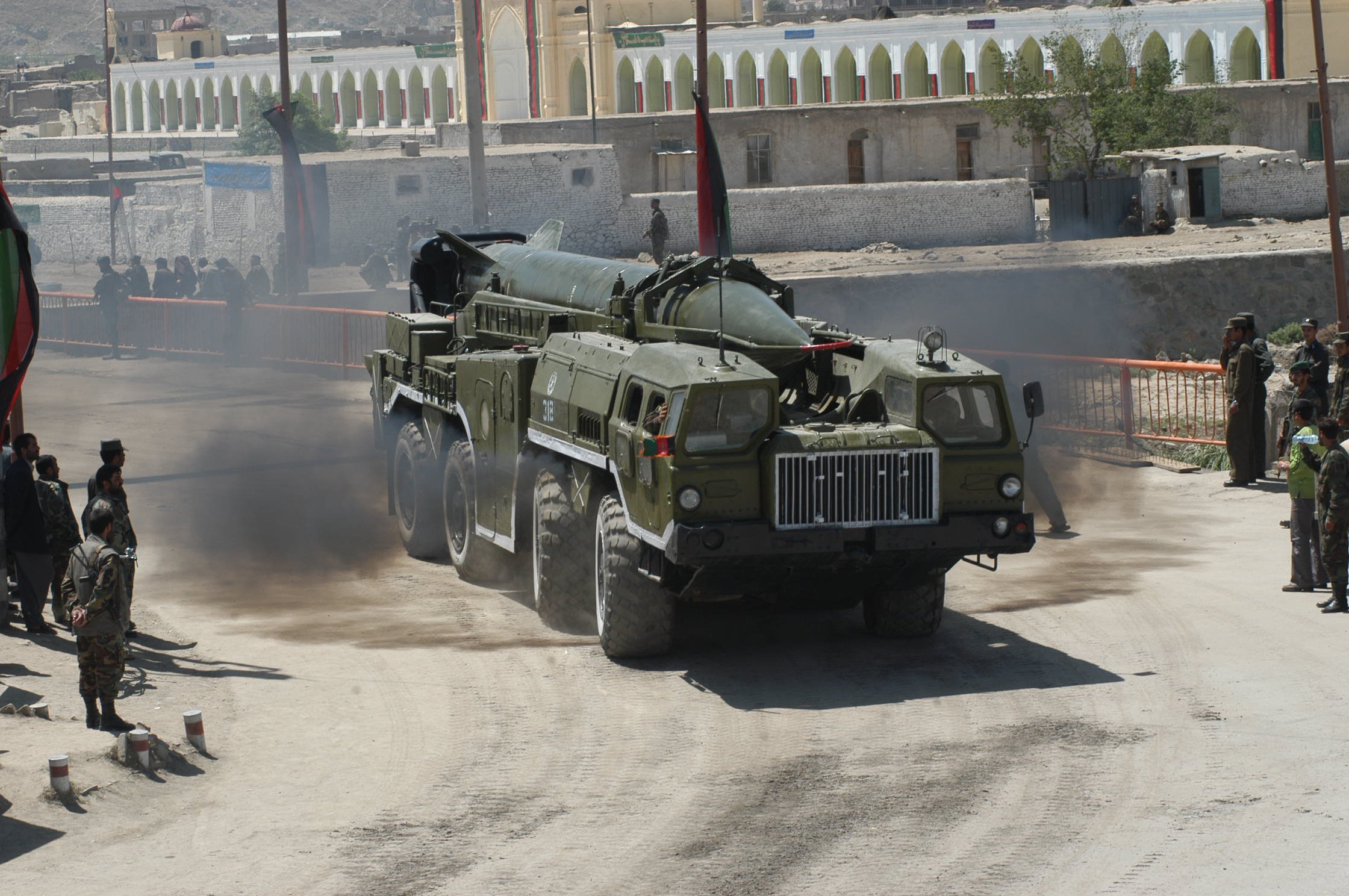
MAZ-7310 with Scud missile of the Afghan National Army

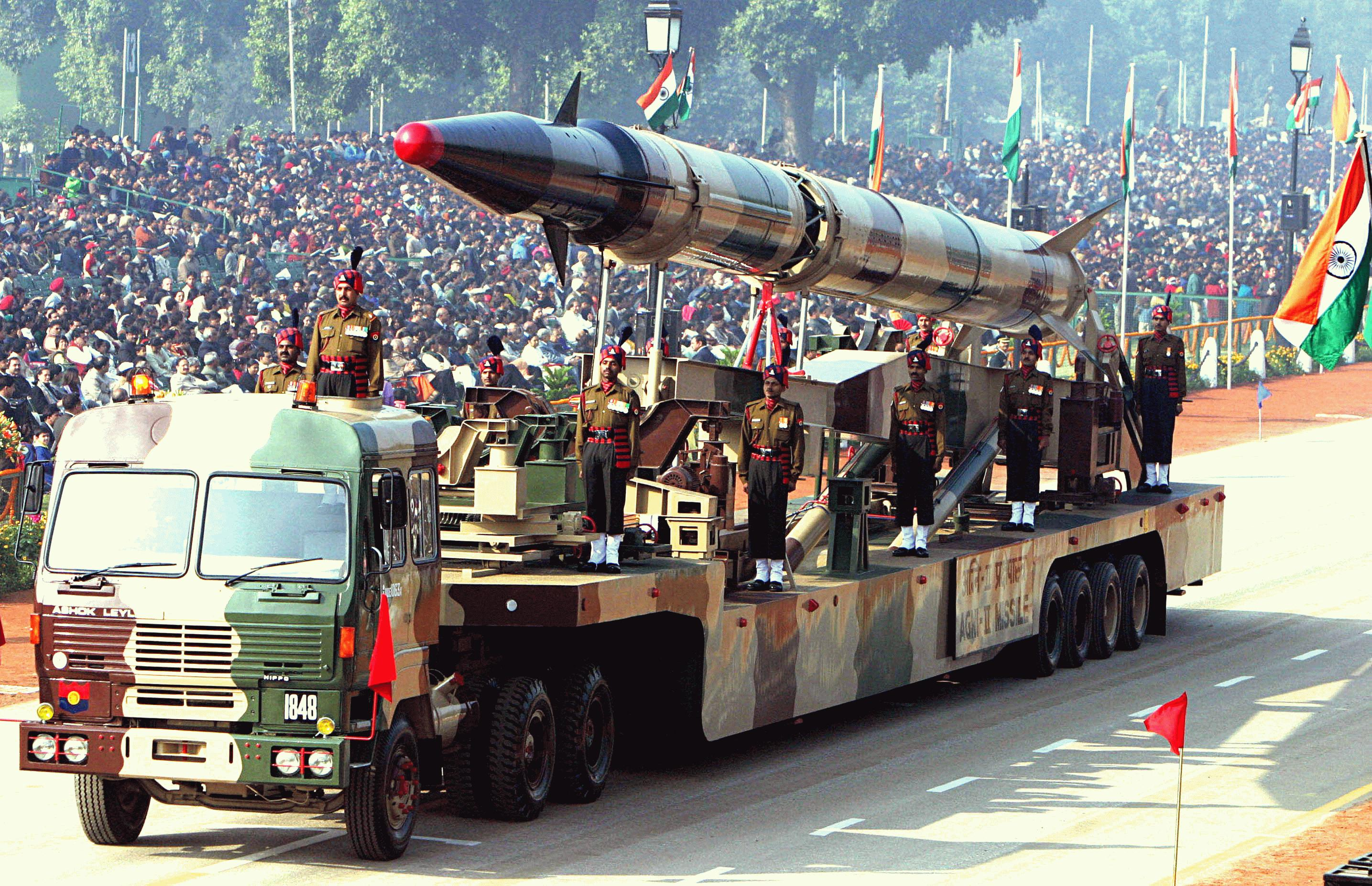
Agni-II missile system of the Indian army

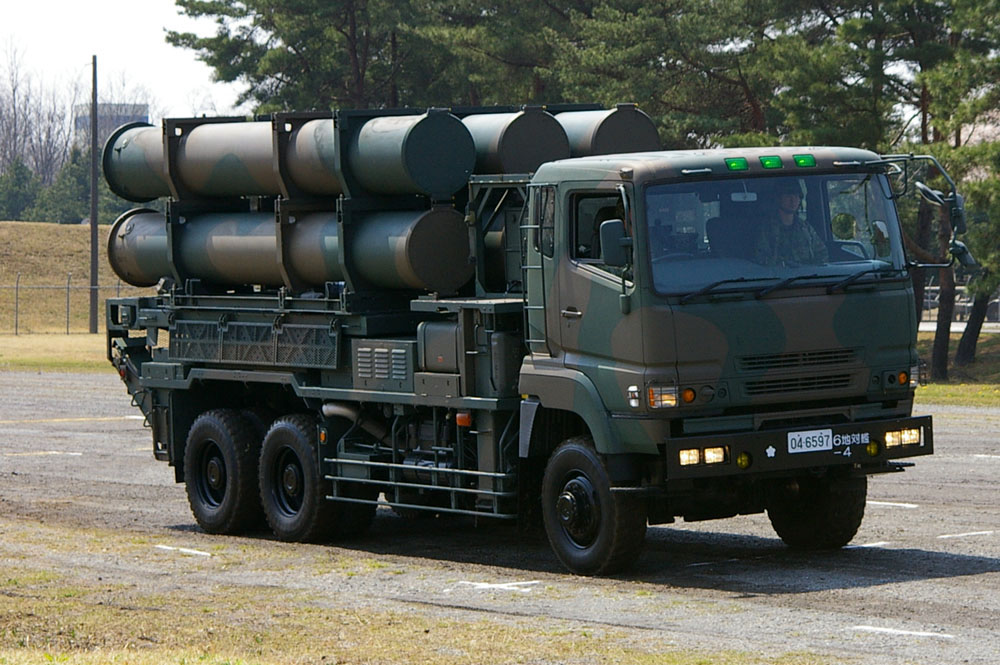
A Type 88 surface-to-ship missile truck of the JGSDF carrying ground-based Type 80 SSM missiles in transport position

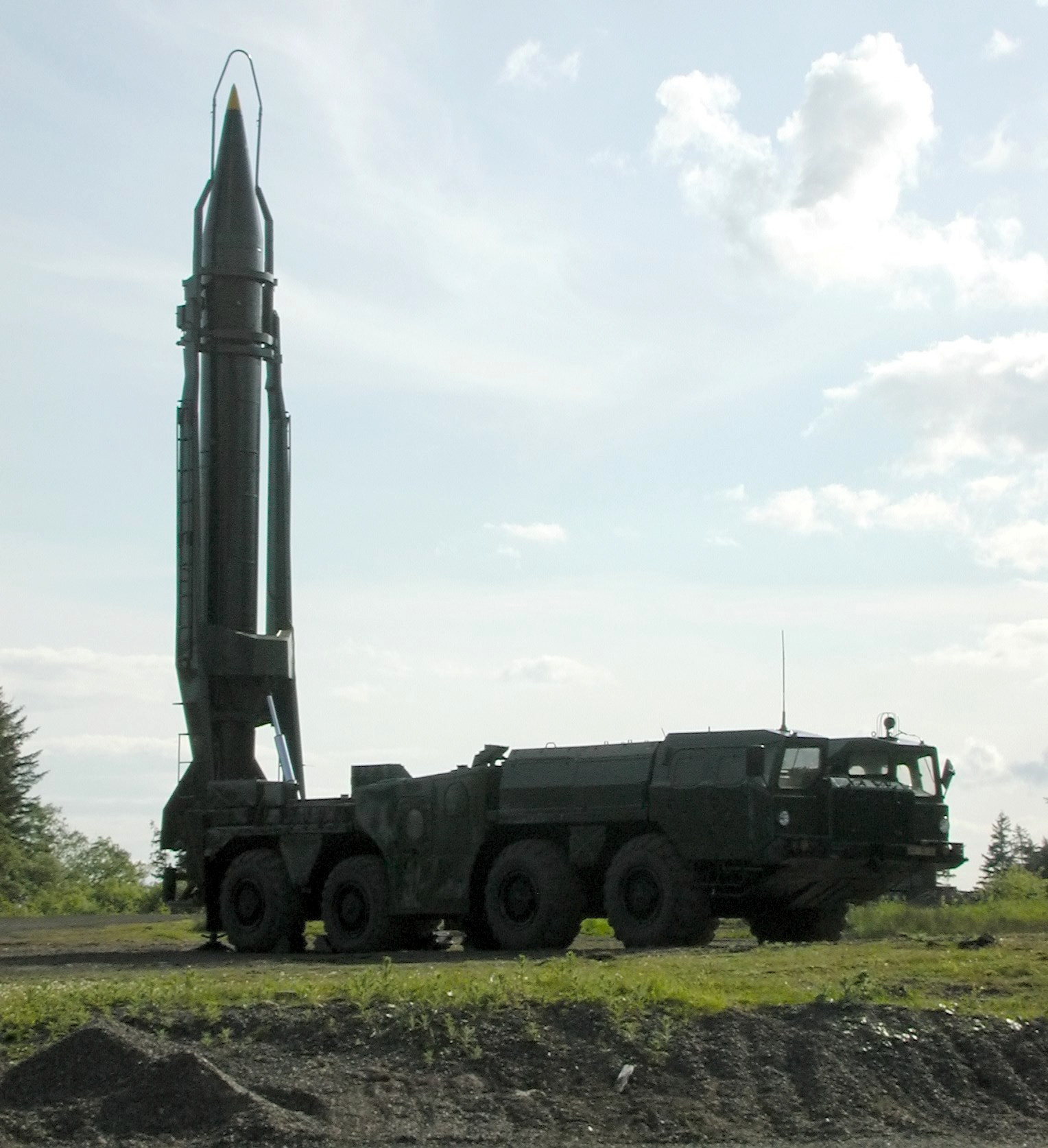
Scud missile transporter erector launcher with missile in vertical position

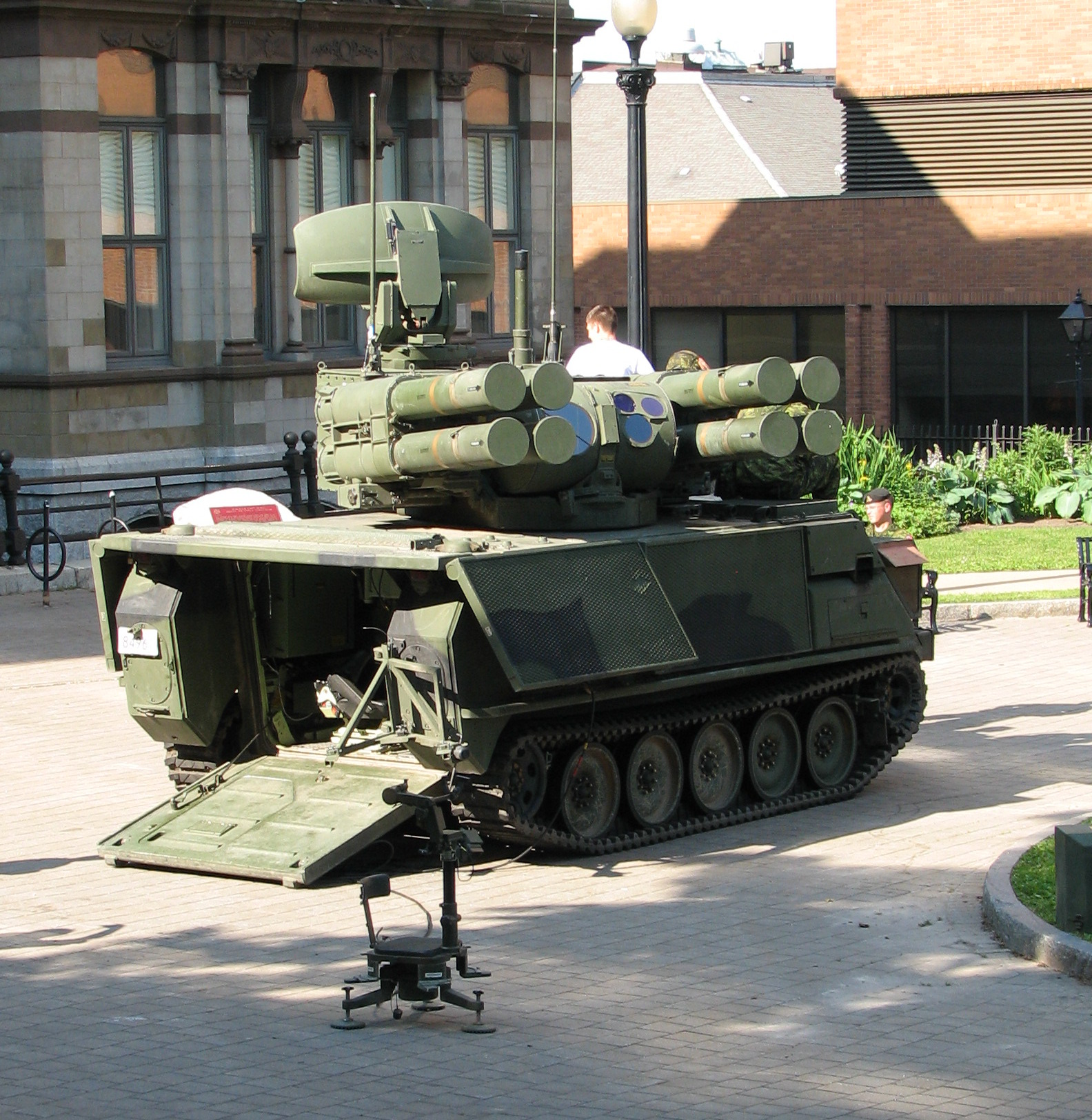
Canadian Armed Forces M113 APC with Air Defense Anti-Tank System (ADATS)

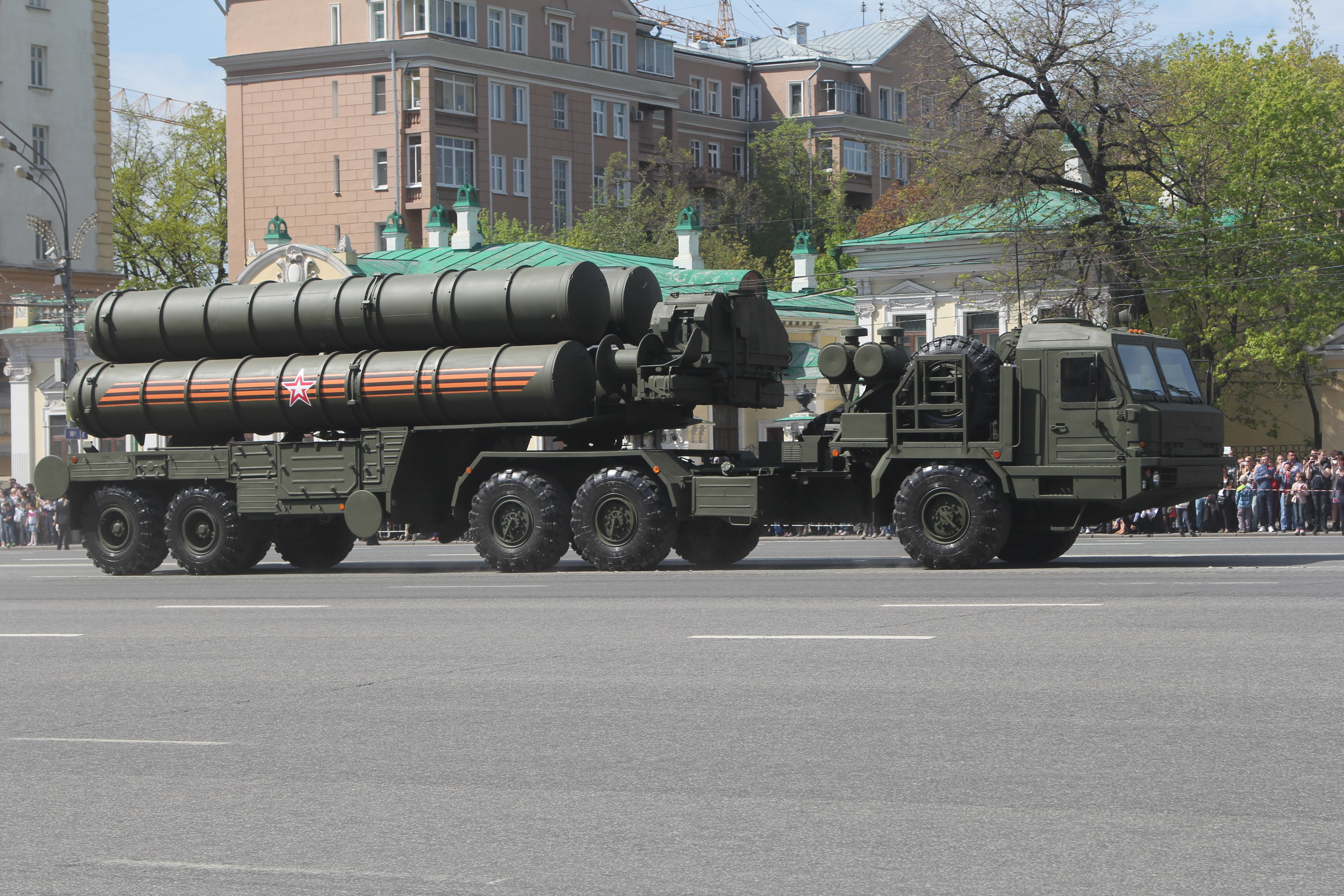
Russian S-400 Triumf launch vehicle with missiles in horizontal position

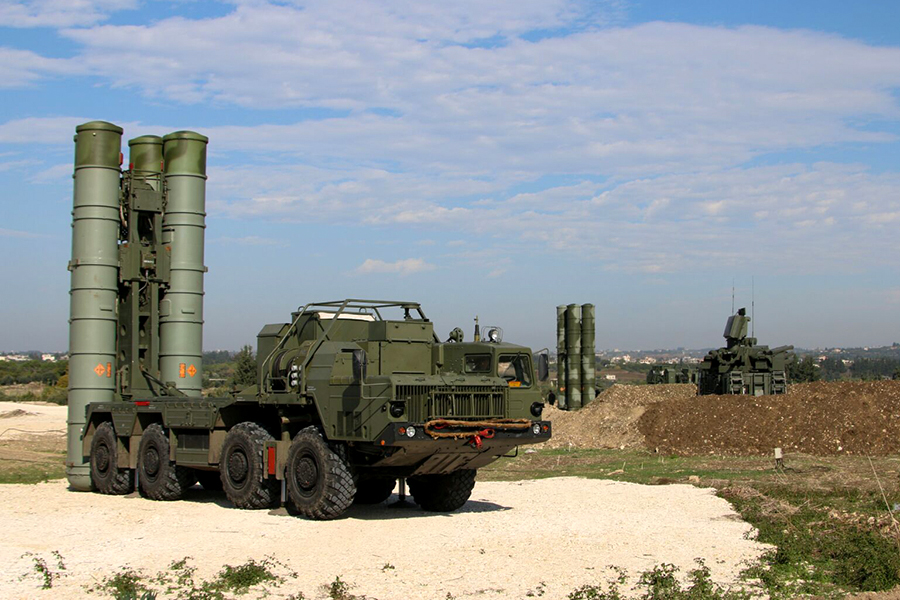
Russian S-400 Triumf missiles in vertical position on ground

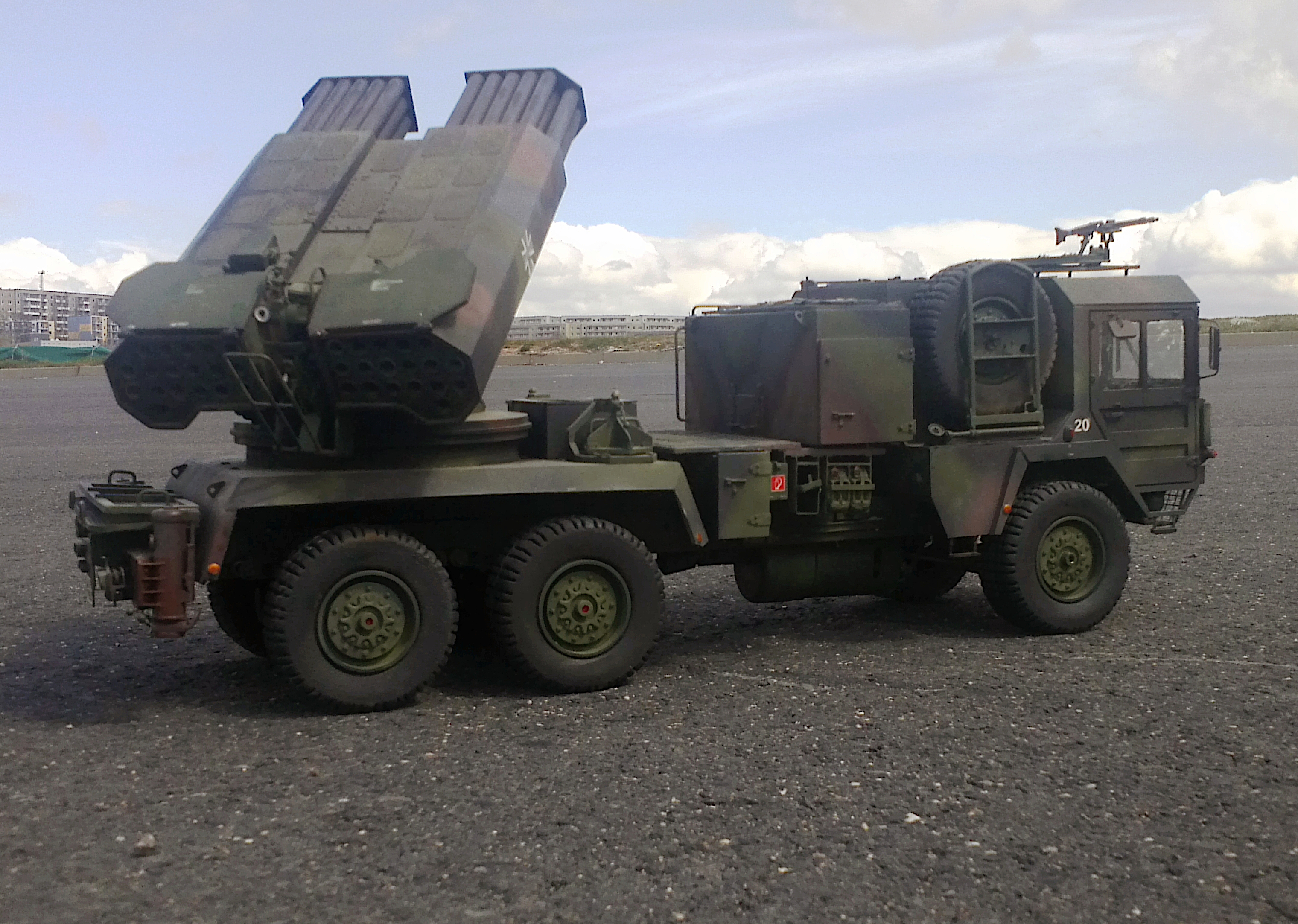
West German Light Artillery Rocket System
