= KamAZ "Shuttle" =

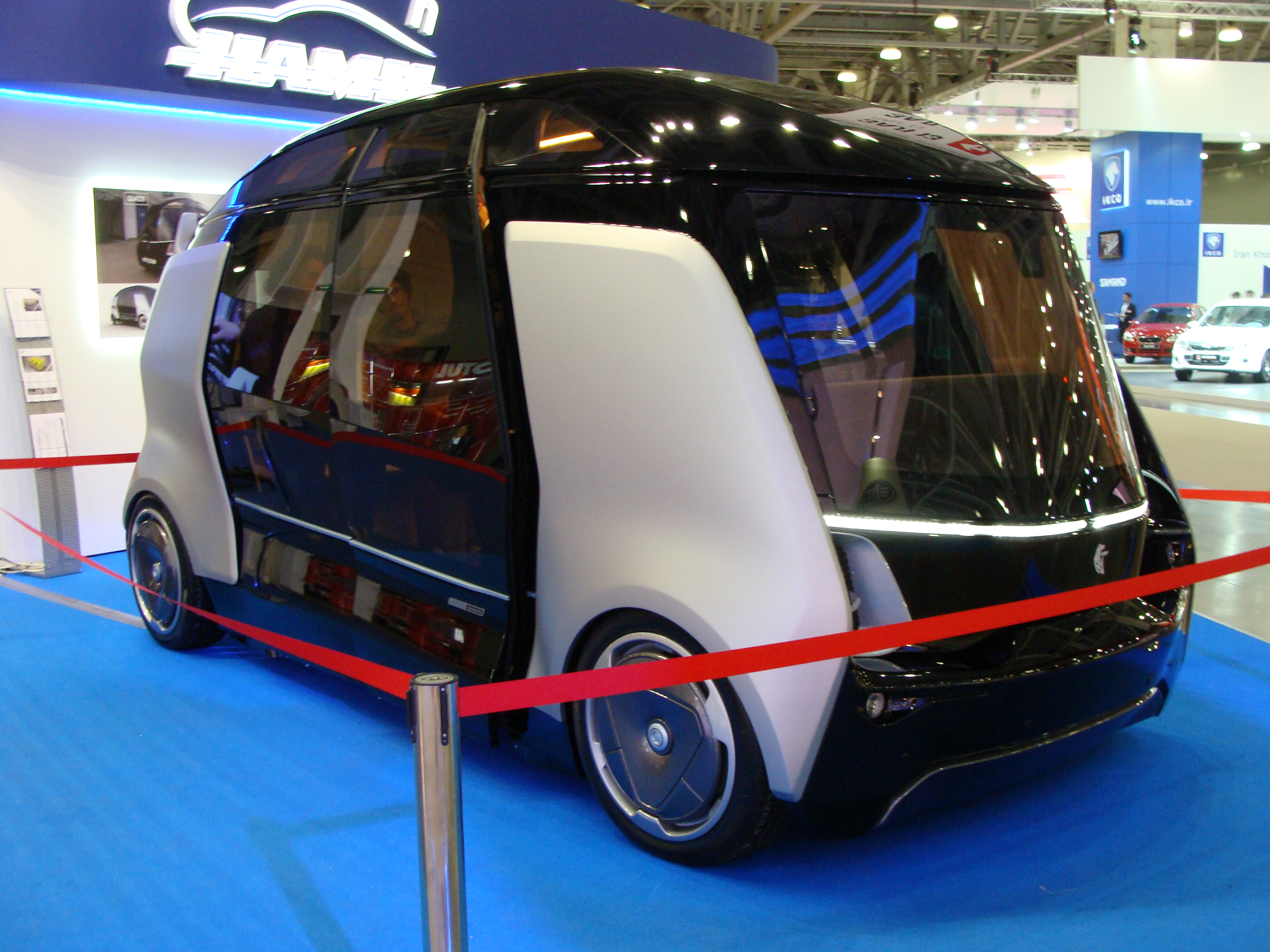

Overview
- Manufacturer: KamAZ
- Production: 2016
- Assembly: Naberezhnye Chelny, Russia

Body and chassis
- Class: Minibus
- Layout: Wheel hub motor

Powertrain
- Engine: Electric motor

The KamAZ "Shuttle" is an electric bus with autopilot. The shuttle was joint development by the AERI and the KamAZ Automobile Plant. It was first presented at the Moscow International Automobile Salon in 2016.

Connected to the Yandex project development team, that is responsible for the creation of infrastructure for route and traffic density data processing.
