= MAZ-7310 =

Soviet heavy military truck

The MAZ-543/MAZ-7310 "Uragan" (Russian: МАЗ-543/МАЗ-7310 «Ураган», lit. 'Hurricane') is a Soviet/Belarusian 8×8 artillery truck designed and developed by the Minsk Automobile Plant, which is now in Belarus.

== MAZ-543 ==
MAZ-543 carrying SS-1с Scud B (9K72 Elbrus).

Designed in the 1960s, the MAZ-543 was presented on 7 November 1965 during the Moscow Red Square military parade as part of SS-1с Scud B (9K72 Elbrus) system. The vehicle is powered by a 38.9 litre D12A-525 tank diesel engine producing around 525 horsepower, and gives a maximum road speed of 37 mph (60 km/h). There have been a number of variants.

=== MAZ-543A ===
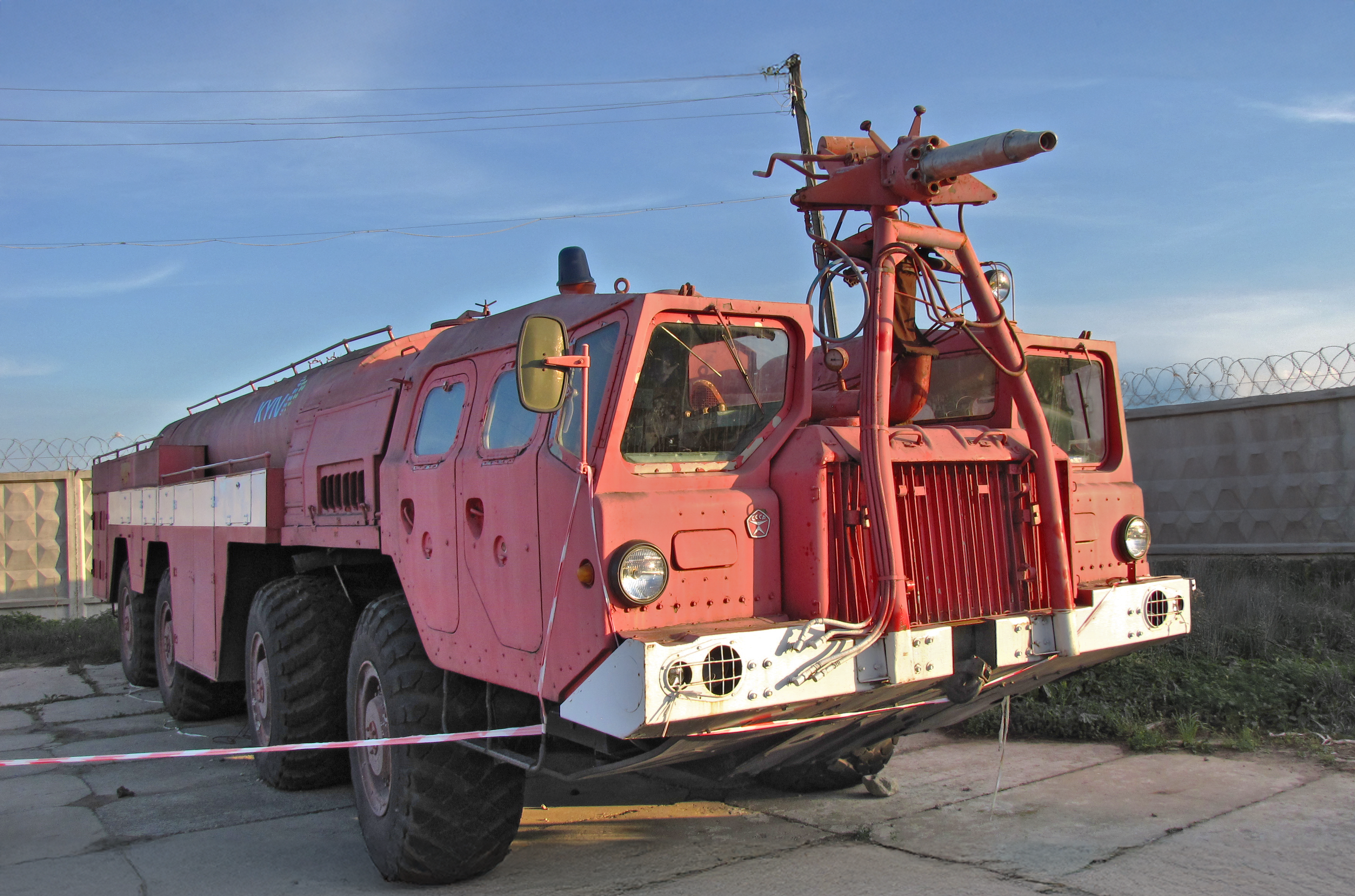
MAZ-7310 АА-60 airport tender, at Ukraine State Aviation Museum.

The 1967 MAZ-543A, arrived (with extra carrying capacity up to 22000 kg).

The MAZ-7310 could operate together with 4WD MAZ-8385 trailer as a road-train (total length - 205.5 m) for oil surveying. It was used in Siberia and also as a tractor on military airbases.

=== MAZ-543M ===
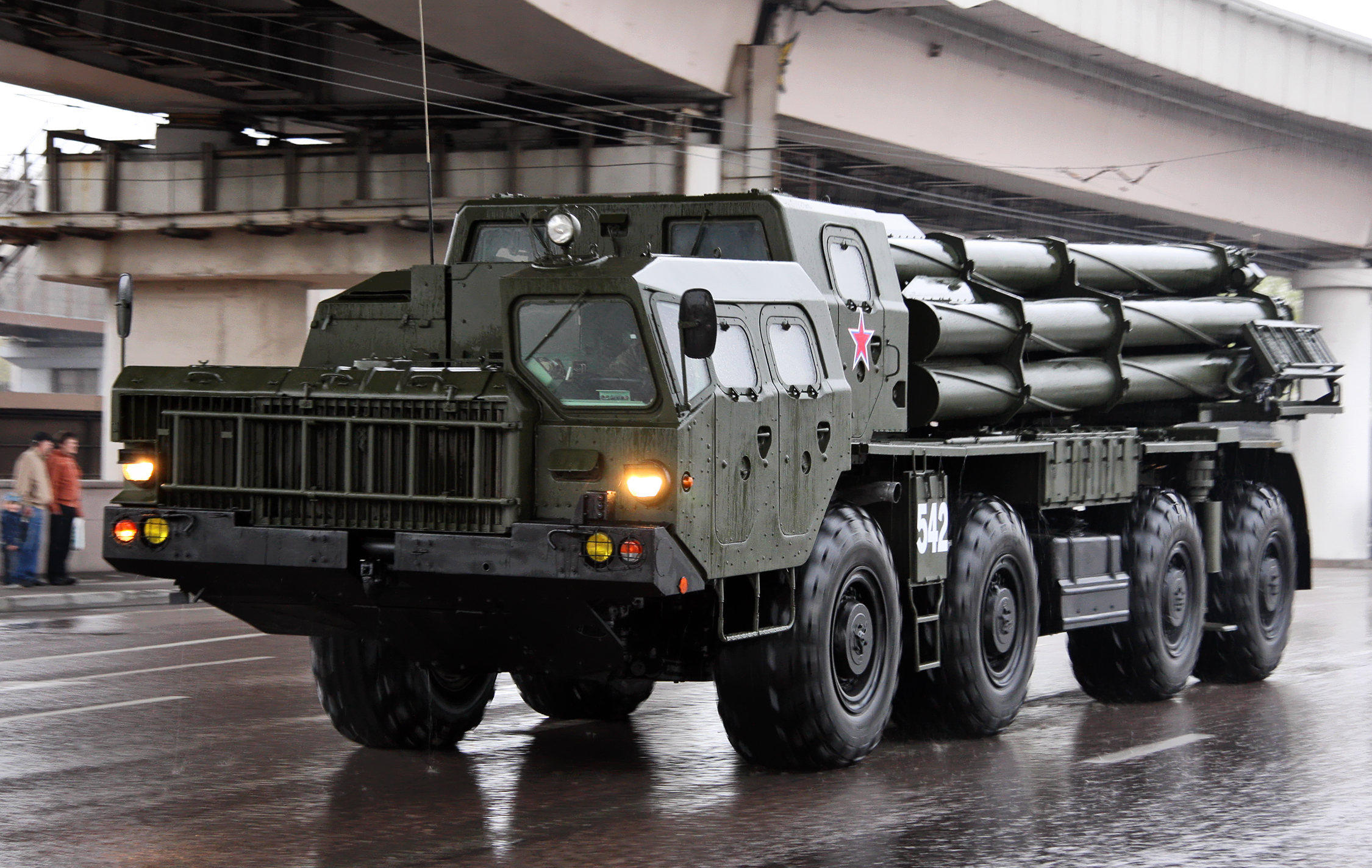
MAZ-543M BM-30 Smerch.

The MAZ-543M version was designed to carry the BM-30 Smerch Multiple rocket launcher.

=== MAZ-543P ===
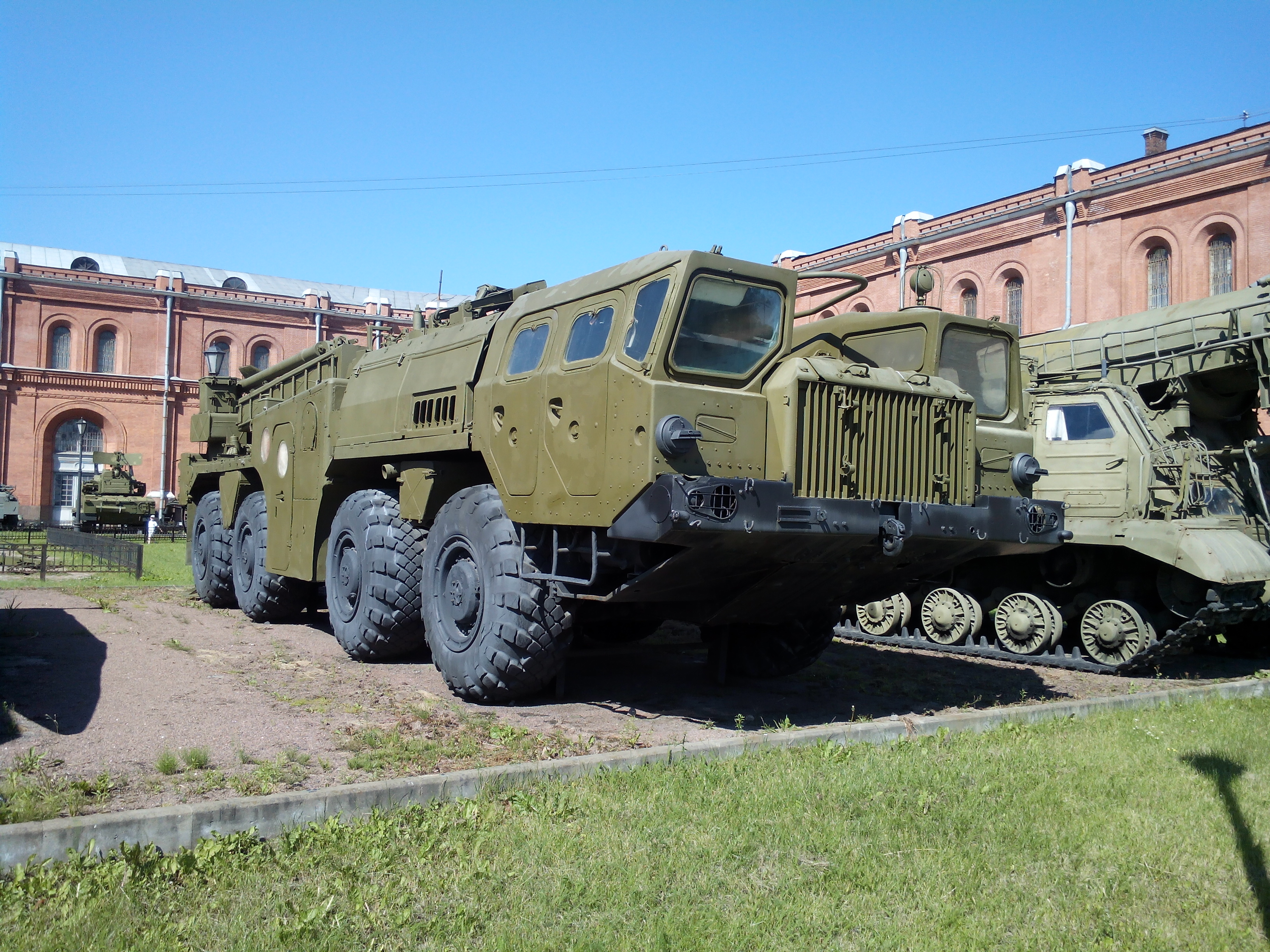
9K72 Elbrus launcher (9P117).

The MAZ-543P (carrying capacity - 19600 kg) was used for 9K76 Temp-S system.

== MAZ-547 ==
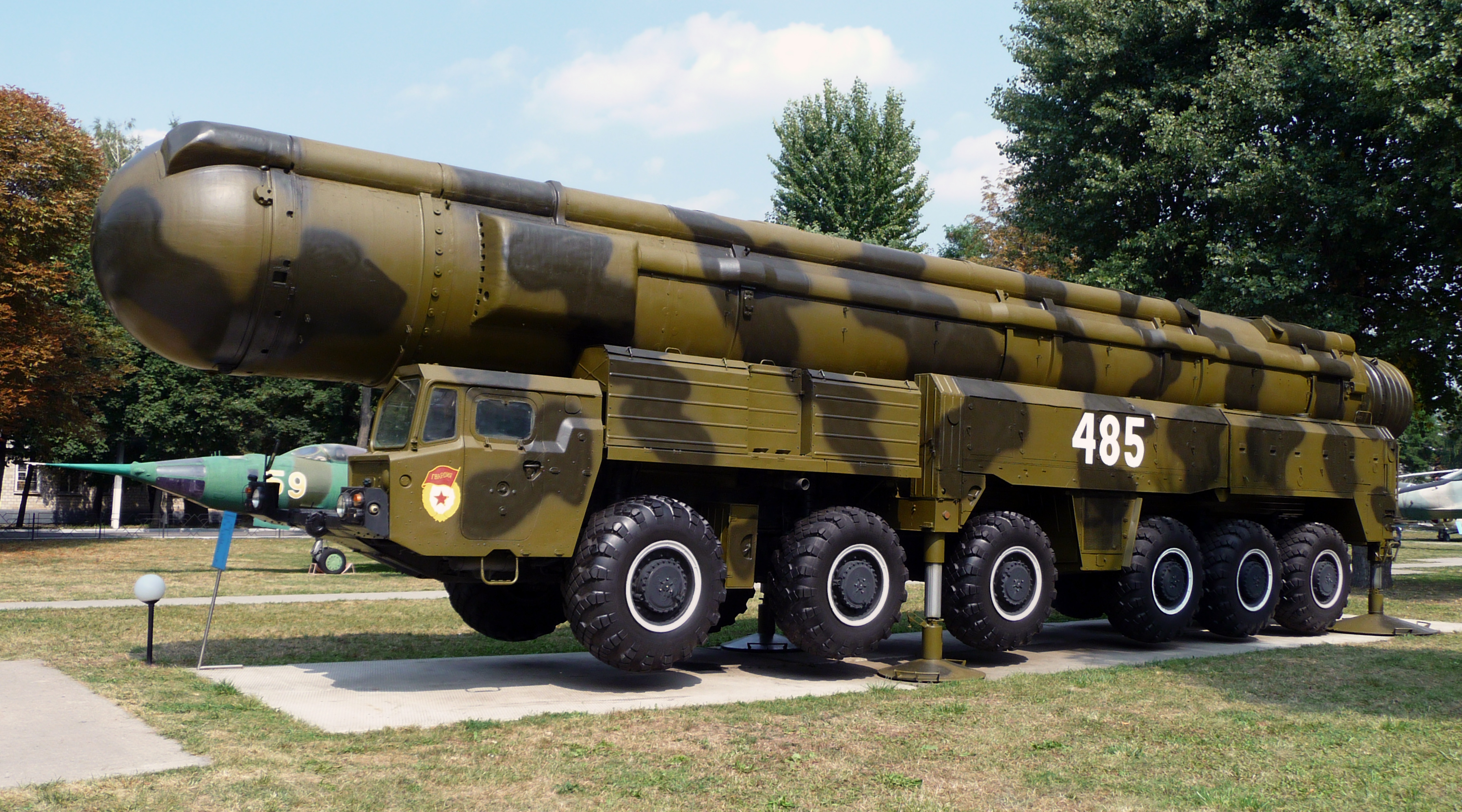
MAZ-547 with RSD-10 Pioneer IRBM.

The MAZ-547 version is a six-axle version, used as Transporter erector launcher for the RSD-10 Pioneer.

== MAZ-7910 ==
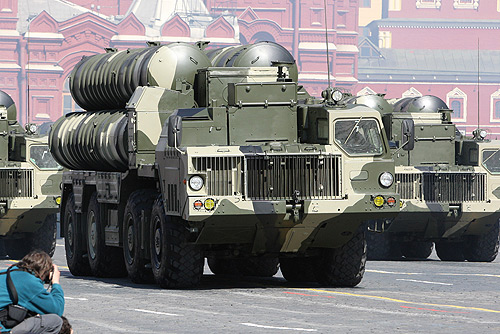
MAZ-7910 with air defense missile complex S-300 (missile).

This variant is used to carry the air defense missile complex S-300PMU-2.

=== MAZ-74106 ===
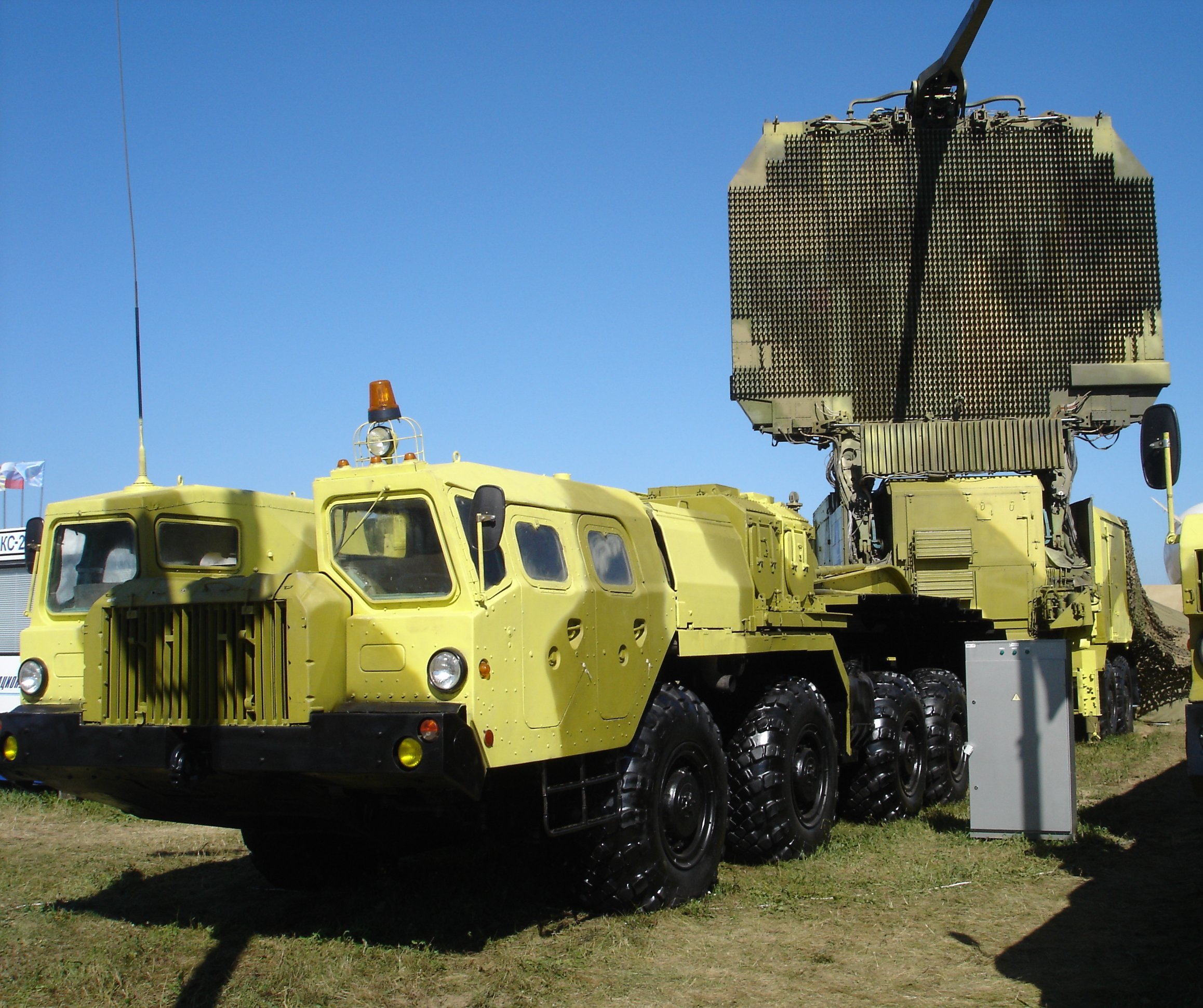
MAZ-74106 with air search radar 64N6 BIG BIRD.

This variant is used mainly to transport the air search radar 64N6 BIG BIRD for the S-300PM.

== WS2400 ==
In 1986, China fielded its version of MAZ-543. Initially designated WS580 but later renamed WS2400, this Chinese version is one of the Wanshan series trucks manufactured by Wanshan Special Vehicle, a wholly owned subsidiary of China Aerospace Sanjiang Space Co. Ltd., which is in turn a subsidiary of China Aerospace Science and Industry Corporation (CASIC). The advantage of the Chinese vehicle is that it utilizes a German diesel engine, transmission and hydraulics manufactured by Wanshan in China, built using technologies transferred from ZF Friedrichshafen.

== See also ==
- ZIL-135
- MAZ-7917
- TA580/TAS5380
- WS2400
- HEMTT
