= Industry in Belarus =

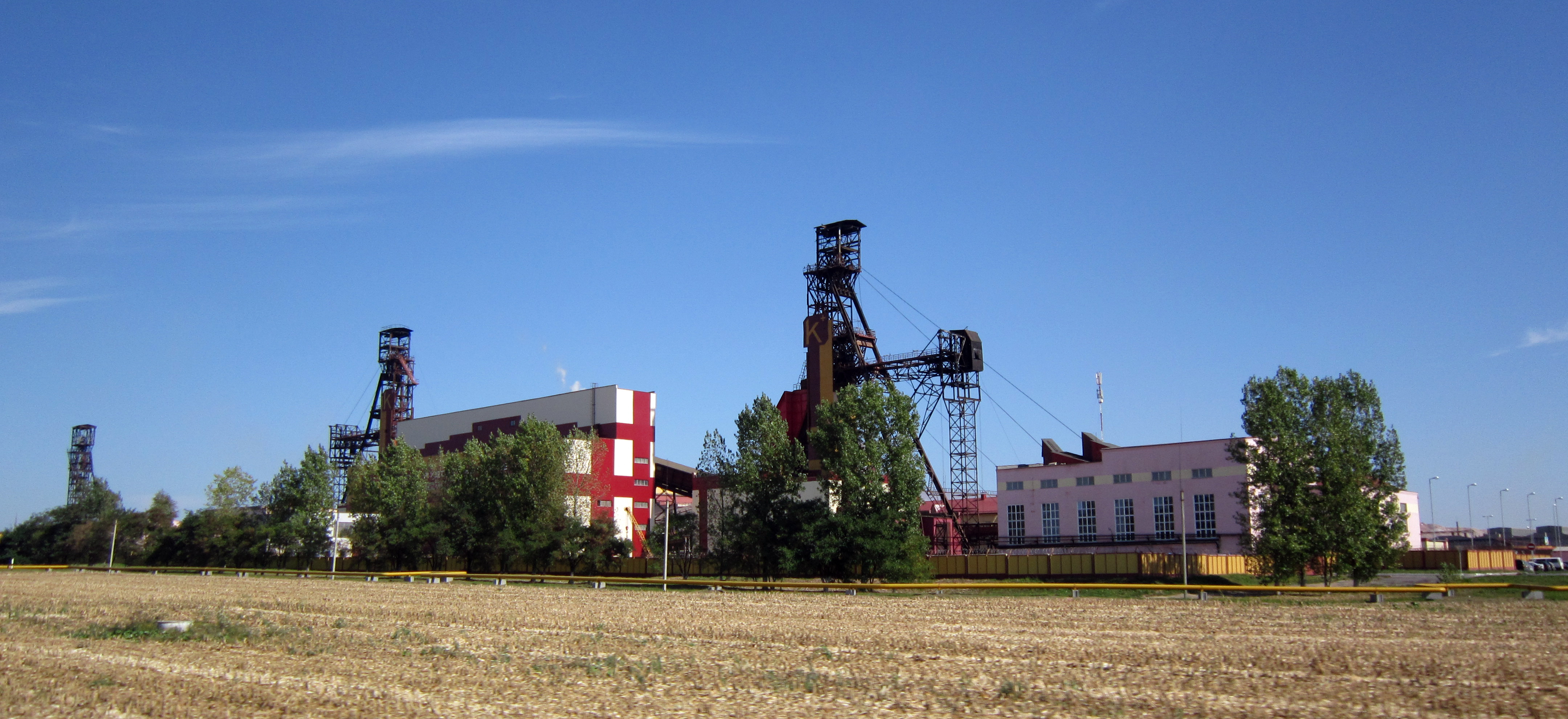
Potash processing plant No 2 of Belaruskali, one of the biggest potash fertilizers producers in the world

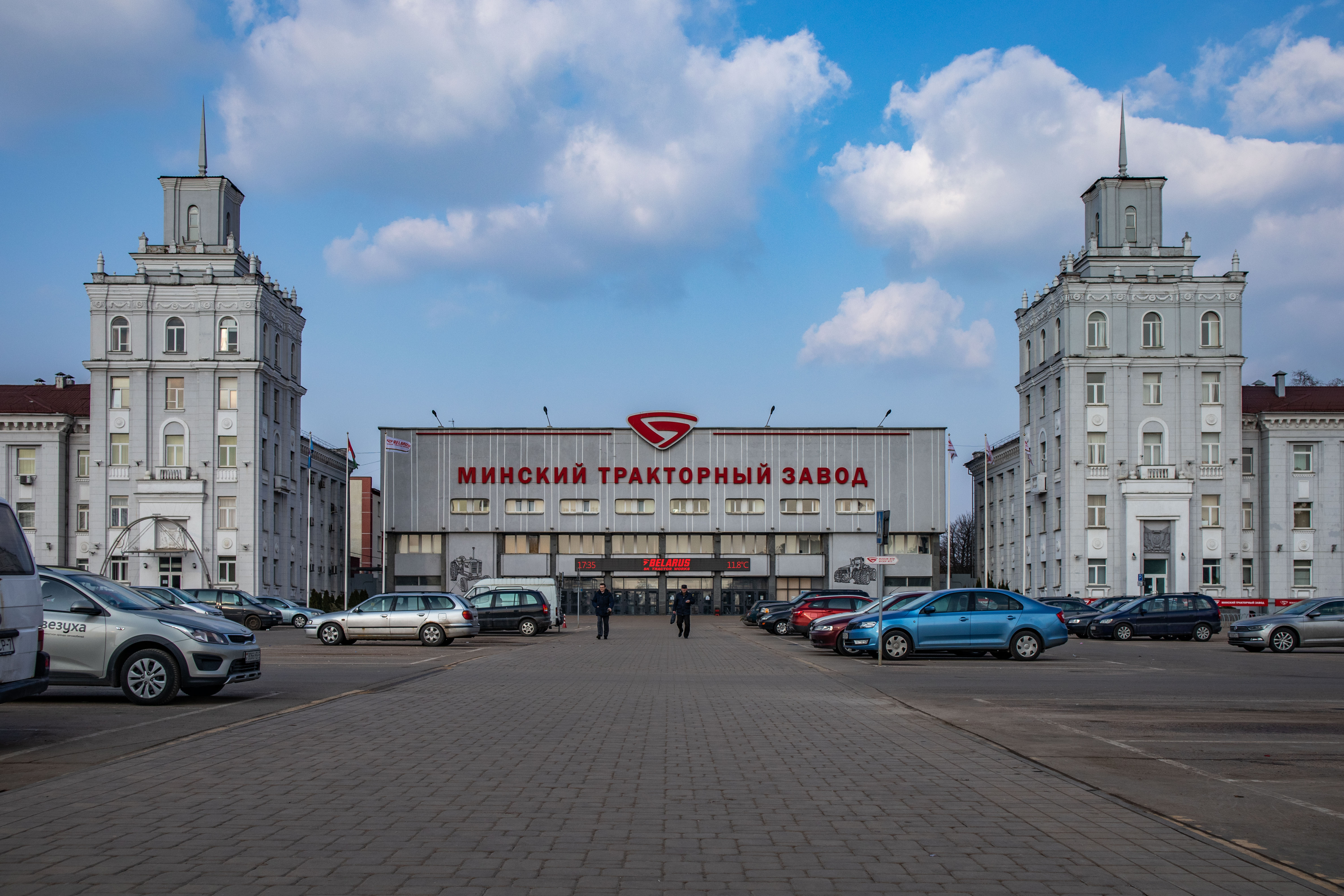
Minsk Tractor Works, a major tractor producer

Industry plays an important role in the economy of Belarus. In 2020, industry accounted for 25.5% of Belarusian GDP. Share of manufacturing (excluding mining, energy and water supply) in Belarusian GDP was 21.3% in 2019. United Nations Economic Commission for Europe described Belarus as having "a well-developed industrial sector and highly skilled workforce". In 2020, 23.5% of the Belarusian workforce was employed in industry. In 2019, total industrial production amounted to 115.7 billion Belarusian rubles (c. US$54 billion); in 2020, it rose to Br 116.5 billion (c. US$44–54 billion (Note: Belarusian rubel to US dollar exchange rate varied in 2020 from 2.15 to 2.65.)). Belarusian industry is export-oriented: in 2020, 61.2% of industrial output was exported. The most important sector is food industry (29.9% share in total manufacturing output). Other well-developed sectors of industry include chemical industry (oil refining, petrochemistry, manufacturing of fertilizers and other chemical goods), automotive industry and manufacturing of other machinery equipment.

== Overview ==
Belarusian industry is generally state-owned. The government has stakes up to 100% in major industrial companies. In 2019, 2.1% of industrial organizations were directly owned by the state, employing 19% of industrial workers while producing 13.4% of industrial output. 3.1% of industrial organizations were formally private but with a state share (up to 100%), and employed 42.2% of workers in industry while producing 52.3% of industrial output. 88.8% of organizations active in industry were private without any state share (they employed 34.5% of workers in industry and produced 28.4% of industrial output), while 6% were foreign-owned enterprises (they employed 4.3% of workers in industry and produced 5.9% of industrial output). State-owned industrial facilities are subordinated to different government bodies depending on the sector of industry: Ministry of industry for machinery and transportation, Belneftekhim state concern for chemical industry, Bellesbumprom state concern for forest industry and furniture production, Bellegprom state concern for textile, clothing and shoe-making industry, Belgospischeprom state concern for food industry.

A few major companies make a huge contribution to the total industrial output. In 2019, the 10 largest manufacturing companies in Belarus accounted for 34.4% of total manufacturing output. Analogous share of the 50 biggest companies was 50.4%.

The Belarusian state jealously guards its capital; the entry of allies such as Russia into the protected realm has proved difficult if not impossible, because the government in Minsk charges exorbitant prices for controlling stakes.

Dominance of state-run major companies negatively affected small and medium business in industry. In 2019, medium, small and microorganizations employed 28.6% of the industrial workforce and produced 18.4% of industrial output. These organizations were most active in production of wood and paper products including printing (47.1% of output in this sector) and least active in food industry (13.9% of output in this sector), manufacturing of chemical products (13.2%) and petrochemistry (no companies).

Some industrial facilities were privatized in the 1990s, often by their workers. A number of factories (both financially successful and unsuccessful) were nationalized during the reign of Alexander Lukashenko, usually without compensation:

- Pinskdrev woodworking and furniture holding (Pinsk)
- Kommunarka confectionery plant (Minsk)
- Motovelo bicycle and motorcycle factory (Minsk)
- Baranovichidrev (Baranavichy)
- Borisovdrev woodworking facility (Barysaw)
- Spartak confectionery plant (Gomel)
- Krasny pischevik confectionery plant ("Red food-maker"; Babruysk)
- Luch shoe-making factory (Minsk)
- Minsk bearing factory
- Keramin ceramic tile factory (Minsk)
- Brest carpet factory
- Belsolod malt factory (Ivanava)
- Orsha aircraft repair plant
- Minskinterkaps pharmaceutical manufacturer

Total net profit (after taxes) in industry was Br 6591.2 billion in 2019, rising from Br 3141.6 billion in 2018.

== Structure ==
In 2020, the share of manufacturing (Russian: обрабатывающая промышленность) in the total industrial output was 88.3%, the share of energy generation and supply was 8.9%, the share of water supply was 1.7%, and the share of mining industry was 1.1%.

National statistical committee Belstat uses OKED classification of industries (Note: Russian: ОКЭД; Общегосударственный классификатор Республики Беларусь ОКРБ 005-2011 "Виды экономической деятельности") for statistical purposes. In 2020, eight sectors had at least 5% share in manufacturing:

- Food industry — 29.9%
- Manufacturing of refined petroleum products — 13.1%
- Chemicail industry — 9.1%
- Manufacturing of plastic, rubber and other nonmetallic mineral products — 7.9%
- Metallurgy and manufacturing of metal products (except transportation and equipment) — 7.3%
- Manufacturing of machinery and equipment not included in other OKED groups (Note: Manufacturing of tractors, bearings, agricultural equipment, machine tools, off-road haul trucks, non-domestic refrigerators, etc.) — 7.1%
- Manufacturing of wood and paper products — 5.8%
- Manufacturing of vehicles and transportation equipment — 5.1%

Other national sources, including the Belarusian encyclopedia, use different Soviet-designed classification of industries (fuel industry, chemical & petrochemical industry, machine building & metalworking industry, etc.).

International sources use different classification of industries.

=== Food industry ===
Food industry (manufacturing of foodstuffs, drinks and tobacco products) is the biggest sector of Belarusian industry. In 2019, 1131 companies were active in the food industry, employing 138.2 thousand workers and generating Br 1182.2 million of net profit (after taxes). Return on sales in food industry was 8.4% in 2019. In 2019, share of dairy products in the total production in food industry was 28.6%, meat products — 24.2%, animal feed — 12.4%, drinks — 8%, oils and fats — 4.4%, confectionery — 4.3%. The biggest companies in the sector are situated in central and western Belarus.

In 2020, Belarusian companies produced 1060.6 thousand tons of meat and edible by-products, 264.8 thousand tons of sausages, 2100 thousand tons of whole milk dairy products (in raw milk equivalent), 119.5 thousand tons of butter, 269.2 thousand tons of cheese, (Note: Excluding processed (melted) cheese.) 69.5 thousand tons of chocolate and confectionery, 16.3 million decaliters of distilled beverages, 43 million decaliters of beer, 43.5 million decalters of soft drinks. In 2019, 638.9 thousand tons of sugar and 430.9 thousand tons of salt was produced.

4 major breweries produce nearly 90% of beer in Belarus: Krynica (Minsk, state-owned), Alivaria (Minsk, major stake owned by Carlsberg Group), Syabar-Heineken (Babruysk), Lidskae Piva (Lida, owned by Olvi). Four major breweries in Minsk (Alivaria), Babruysk, Lida and Rečyca were bought by multinational corporations in the 2000s and early 2010s. In the early 2000s, Krynica brewery in Minsk reached an agreement with Baltika Breweries to transfer its controlling stake ti Baltika in exchange of investments, but later exited the deal unilaterally.

Minsk Kristall is the largest distillery producing 4.81 million dal of vodka and similar beverages, (Note: According to Belarusian classification, this group of goods is called "vodka and liquor-vodka products".) or c. 34% of vodka consumption in Belarus. State-owned distilleries in Brest, Vitebsk, Gomel, Grodno, Klimavichy are other major market players producing more than 1 million dal of vodka and similar beverages. Several private distilleries are active in the sectors, the biggest is Akvadiv (Maladziečna district) co-owned by Vladimir Peftiev and Minsk Kristall.

It's estimated that Belarusian companies produce 2.4% of dairy products in the world. In 2019, Belarus exported US$2384.9 million of dairy products and eggs, US$926 million of meat and its products, US$575 million of vegetables and fruits, US$201.5 million of beverages.

In August 2023, Belarusian PM Roman Golovchenko introduced Agriculture Minister Sergei Bartosh, highlighting strategic priorities like crop optimization and dairy modernization, emphasizing the significance of the sector. The introduction occurred recently, with focus on addressing challenges and revitalizing struggling agricultural enterprises.

==== Cigarettes ====
According to Belarusian classification, manufacturing of cigarettes is a part of food industry. Grodno tobacco factory is the largest producer of cigarettes in the country. In 2019, Alexander Lukashenko gave his associate Aliaksei Aleksin an exclusive right to import tobacco products; Aleksin also started to construct new tobacco factory near Minsk. Cigarettes produced in Belarus are often smuggled to other countries due to low excise rates in Belarus.

=== Chemical industry ===
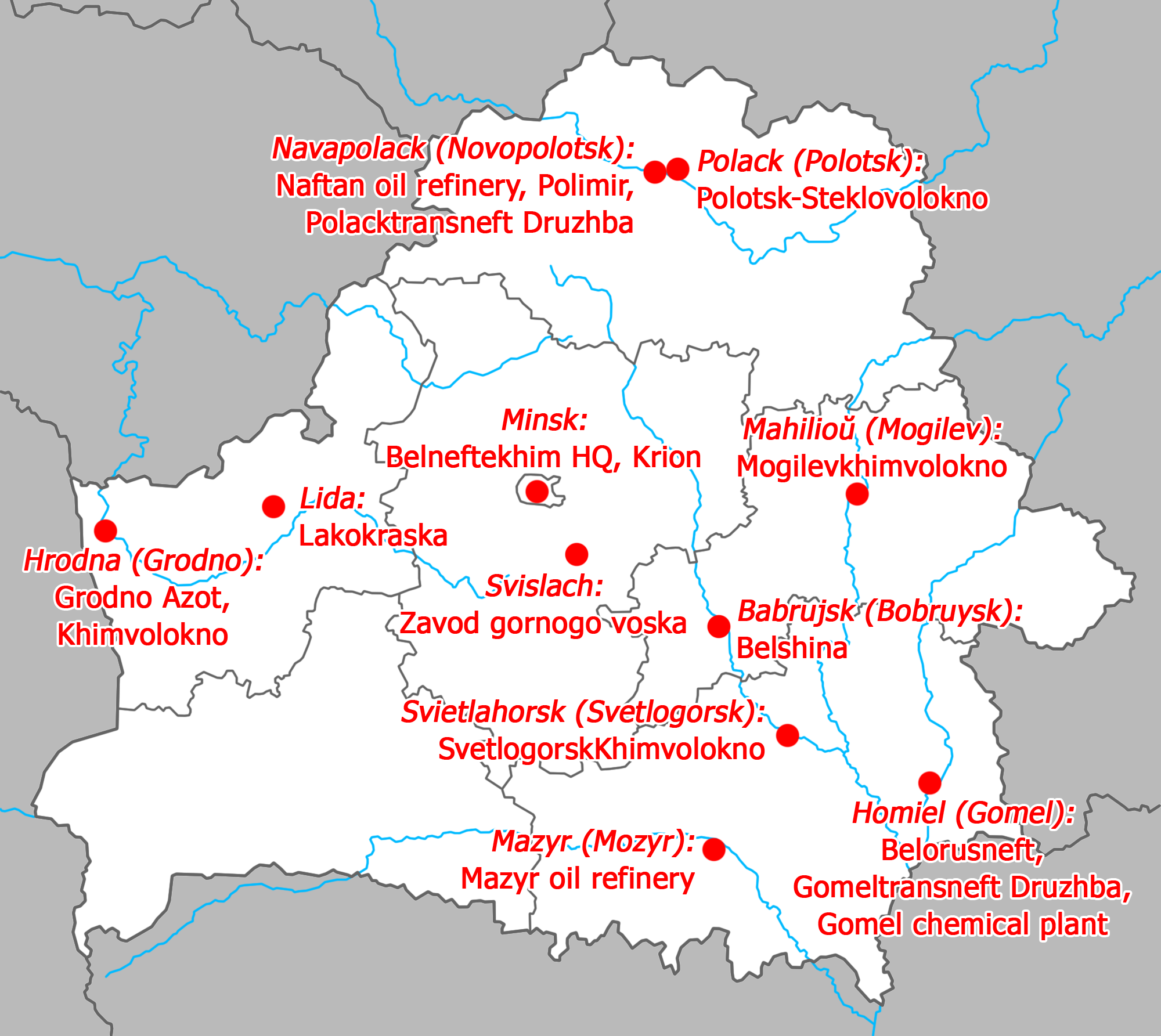
Location of major Belneftekhim companies. Note: Belaruskali is not shown because it was excluded from Belneftekhim in 2014.

Belarus has several major Soviet-built chemical factories. Belarusian statistical agency Belstat currently distinguishes two sectors of chemical industry — "manufacturing of coke and refined petroleum products" and "manufacturing of chemical products". The core of oil processing sector are two plants: Naftan refinery in Novopolotsk and Mozyr refinery. The main subsector of manufacturing of chemical products is production of fertilizers (76.5% of output in manufacturing of chemical products in 2019), other notable subsectors are manufacturing of synthetic fibers (6.3%), household chemicals (5.1%), varnishes and paints (4.9%).

In 2020, Belarusian companies produced 3224.4 thousand tons of motor gasoline, 5825.6 thousand tons of diesel fuel, 8698 thousand tons of mineral and chemical fertilizers, 205.8 thousand tons of chemical fibers. In 2019, 17,853 thousand tons of crude oil was processed. Of 8553.4 thousand tons of fertilizers produced in 2019, 7348.2 thousand tons were potash fertilizers (Belaruskali), 988.2 thousand tons — nitrogen fertilizers (Grodno Azot), 217 thousand tons — phosphorus fertilizers (Gomel chemical plant). In 2019, Belarusian companies also produced 1100.8 thousand tons of ammonia, 1005.4 thousand tons of sulphuric acid and oleum, 741.4 thousand tons of polymers (in primary forms), 216.4 thousand tons of synthetic fibers, 68.8 thousand tons of detergents, 26.2 thousand tons of pesticides, 5.7 thousand tons of cosmetics for skin.

In 2019, 38 companies were active in petroleum refining sector with 13.1 thousand workers and 492 companies were active in manufacturing of chemical products with 48.1 thousand workers. Total industrial production in petroleum refining sector amounted to Br 16,672 million (c. US$7.8 billion), in chemistry proper — Br 10,413 million (c. US$4.8 billion).

The majority of big companies in the sector are operated by the government via Belneftekhim state enterprise subordinated to the Council of Ministers.

The biggest company is Belaruskali (100% state-owned) which is one of the largest potash producers in the world, its global market share is estimated at 16%. Other major factories are:

- Naftan oil refinery in Novopolotsk (99.83% state-owned)
- Mozyr Oil Refinery (42.77% state-owned, Russian Rosneft owns large share)
- Belshina, tire factory in Babruysk (100% state-owned)
- Grodno Azot, nitrogen fertilizers factory in Grodno (99.97% state-owned)
- Mogilevkhimvolokno, synthetic fibers factory in MMogilev (90.45% state-owned)
- Khimvolokno, synthetic fibers factory in Grodno (currently — branch of Grodno Azot)
- SvietlahorskKhimvolokno, synthetic fibers factory in Svietlahorsk (100% state-owned)
- Polimir, plastic producer in Novopolotsk (currently — branch of Naftan)

In 2012, Alexander Lukashenko transferred defunct factory of protein-vitamin concentrates used in animal husbandry (Russian: Завод белково-витаминных концентратов) in Novopolotsk to Interservis company owned by his alleged associate Mikalai Varabei to construct third oil refinery. As of 2021, the refinery wasn't constructed.

In the late 2010s, a major reconstruction of Naftan oil refinery started. According to Belneftekhim's official site, over US$1 billion was invested in the reconstruction. As of June 2021, modernization of Naftan hasn't been completed, total amount of investments was estimated at US$1.6 billion.

Belarusian oil refineries are critically dependent from import of Russian oil via Druzhba pipeline. In 2020, plans to diversificate oil imports using Lithuanian and Ukrainian ports were voiced again. Oil disputes with Russia are a major political issue in bilaterial relations. Belarus uses several small oil deposits (c. 1.5-1.7 million tons are produced every year) but the crude oil is exported via Druzhba pipeline. Notable deposits of oil shale aren't used (as of 2021).

Belaruskali produces potash fertilizers using raw minerals (sylvinite and carnallite) from local mines in Polesian Lowland, Grodno Azot uses large amounts of imported natural gas to produce nitrogen fertilizers, Gomel chemical plant imports raw minerals to produce phosphorus fertilizers and other chemical substances.

Export of refined petroleum and chemical products are major part of Belarusian foreign trade. In 2019, Belarus exported US$6259.7 million of petroleum, its products and related materials (18.99% of overall exportl; in 2018, it exceeded US$8 billion) and US$3259 million of fertilizers (9.89% of exports).

=== Automotive industry and other machinery ===
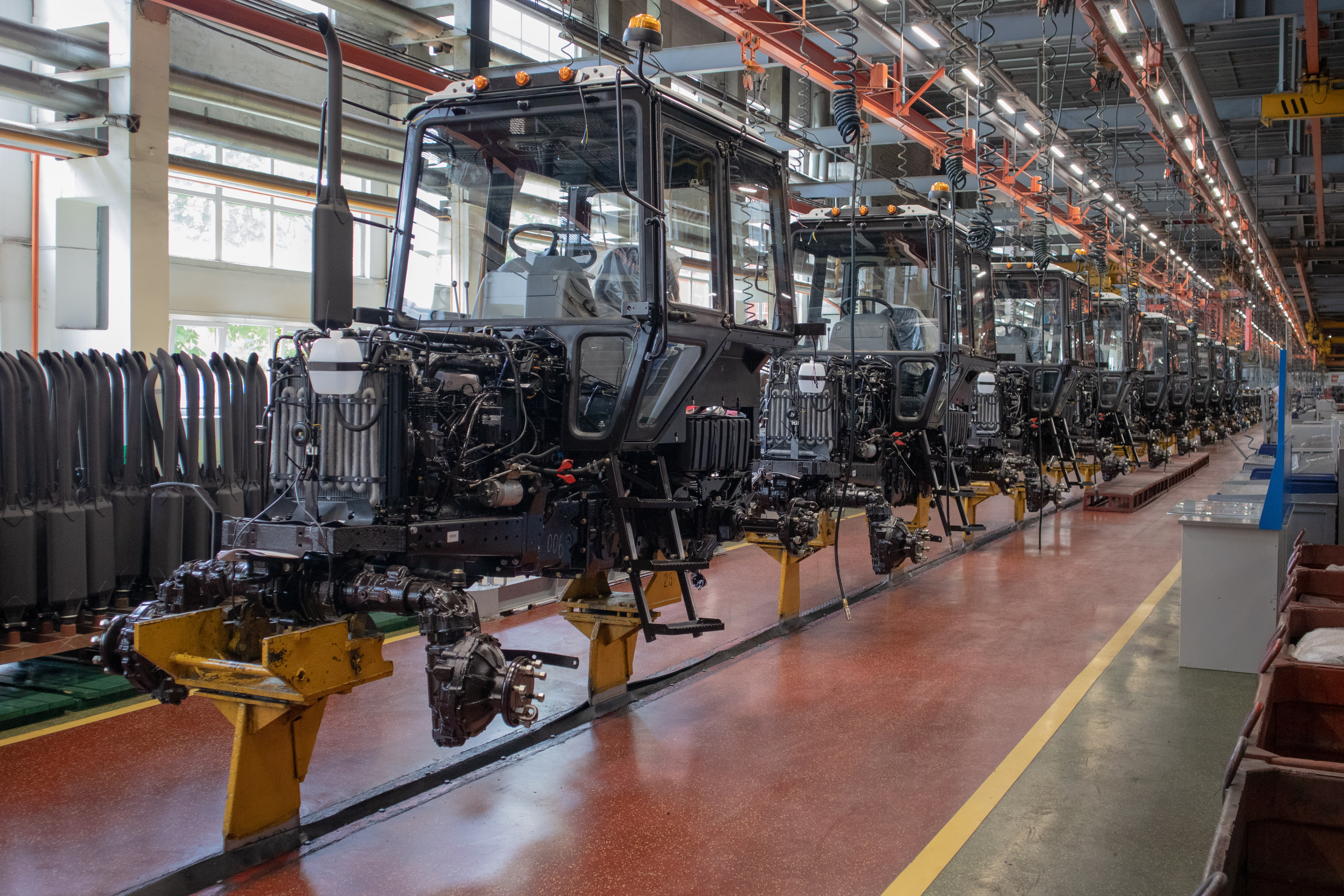
Assembly line using conveyor system at Minsk Tractor Works

Automotive industry in Belarus emerged in the 1940s when the Minsk Automobile Plant (MAZ) was built. In the 1950s, production of haul trucks was moved from MAZ to BelAZ factory in Zhodzina. In 1991, MZKT factory split off from MAZ. In 1992–1993, MAZ started to produce buses and Belkommunmash factory in Minsk started to produce trolleybuses. A number of factories producing automotive units are situated in Belarus (Baranavichy, Barysaw, Grodno, Minsk and other cities). The biggest manufacturers of agricultural equipment are Minsk Tractor Works (MTZ, Minsk) and Gomselmash (Gomel), other major factories are situated in Lida and Babruysk. Belarusian BelAZ heavy dump truck factory is estimated to be one of the biggest in the world.

The largest plants are 100% state-owned: MTZ, MAZ, MZKT, Gomselmash, BelAZ. Minsk city council has 99.45% share in Belkommunmash (BKM). State-owned factories in the sector are economically independent forming holding companies with minor factories. The sector is overseed by the Ministry of industry of Belarus. Controlling stake of Amkodor construction and forestry machinery manufacturer (former "Udarnik" factory in Minsk) is owned by Aliaksandr Shakutsin who was recognized as a person "who benefited most from the privatisation during Lukashenko's tenure as President" by the Council of the European Union.

In 2020, 39.5 thousand tractors (for agriculture and forestry), 2.5 thousand metal-processing machines, 9.1 thousand trucks and 1349 buses (excluding trolleybuses) were produced. In 2019, 1451 buses, 133 trolleybuses, 1062 special vehicles, 2464 cargo trailers and semi-trailers, 3428 motorcycles, 67.2 thousand bicycles, 62 passenger railroad cars (including multiple units and trams), 2946 cargo railroad cars were manufactured. Agricultural machines (including self-propelled vehicles) manufactured in 2019 included 640 combine harvesters (for cereals), 254 forage harvesters, 6270 agricultural trailers and semi-trailers.

Belarus has two assemblers of cars from SKD kits: BelGee (joint venture of Belarusian state-owned BelAZ and Chinese Geely) and Unison (private company using former Ford Union workshops). Number of cars produced:

2015	2016	2017	2018	2019
8,681	10,348	3,856	11,122	20,584

Belarus has no specialised manufacturer of light commercial vehicles (LCVs), but MAZ tried to enter the market twice. In 2010, MAZ-181 and 182 (based on Chinese copies of Toyota HiAce H100) were presented. In 2019, MAZ presented MAZ-3650 LCV and MAZ-281 minibus which are SKD-assembled JAC Sunrise.

The sole manufacturer of combustion engines is Minsk Motor Works (MMZ) but it specializes on production of diesel engines for tractors and heavy trucks. MAZ got the majority of its engines from Yaroslavl Motor Plant in Russia and from European producers. In the late 2010s, a joint venture with Chinese Weichai Power was established to assemble engines for MAZ in Belarus. In 2019, 66.7 thousand engines were produced in Belarus.

Belarus has two producers of rolling stock (railway cars) in Mogilev and Asipovichy. Swiss manufacturer Stadler Rail established assembly factory in Fanipal near Minsk to produce passenger trains. Lida depot of Belarusian Railway made a major overhaul of ChME3 diesel electric locomotive giving it new name TME1. Belkommunmash produces trams.

Belarus has no established aerospace manufacturers, but during the Soviet era three aircraft repair plants were built in Belarus: No 558 in Baranavichy (repairs military aircraft; also produces UAVs), No 407 in Minsk (repairs civil aircraft), No 571 in Balbasavo near Orsha (repaired Tu-16 and Tu-22 bombers, recently changed its specialization to helicopters). Aircraft Repair Plant Avia407 relocated from Minsk-1 airport to the new Minsk National Airport in 2018, following the closure of Minsk-1.

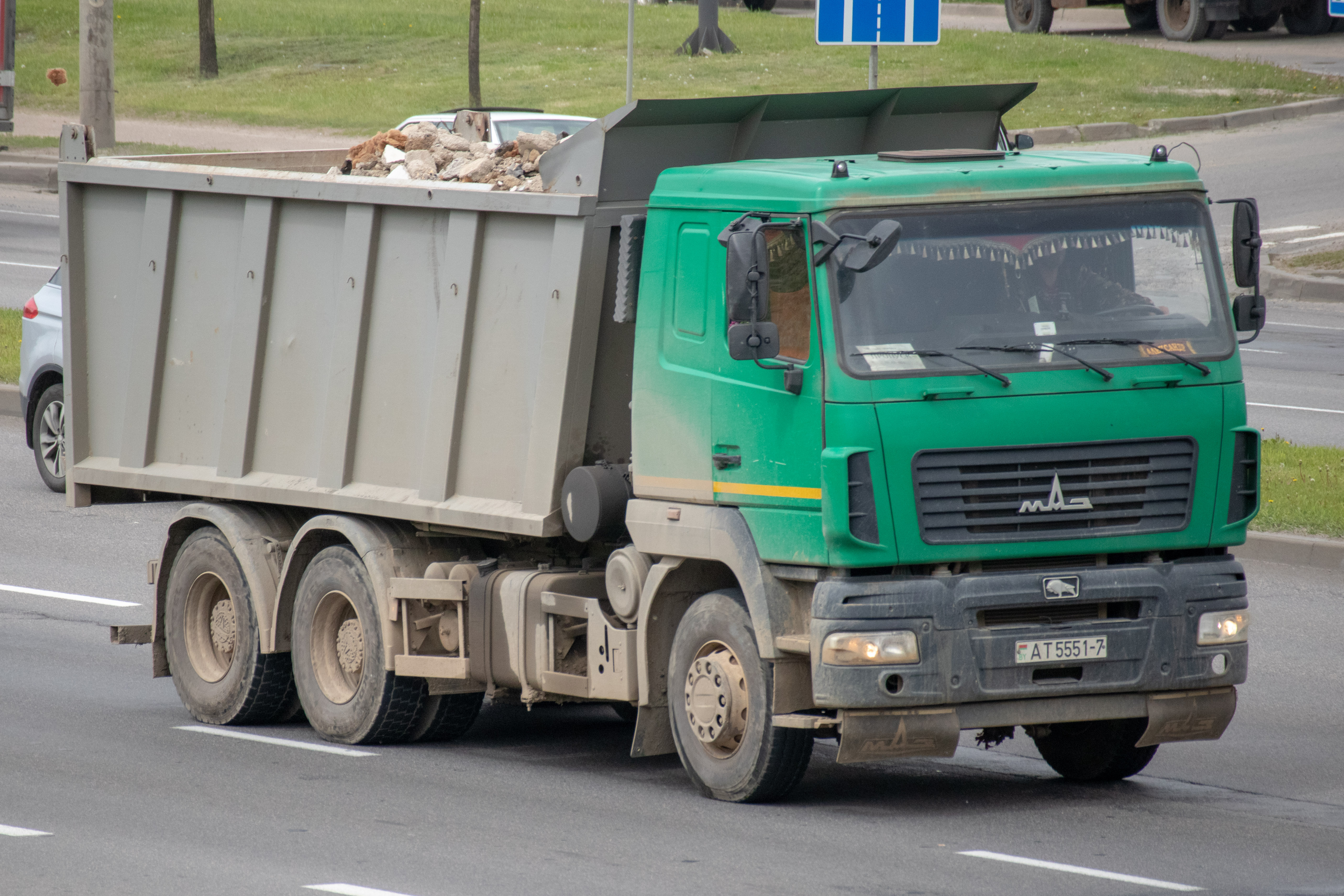
MAZ-6501 dump truck (Minsk Automobile Plant)

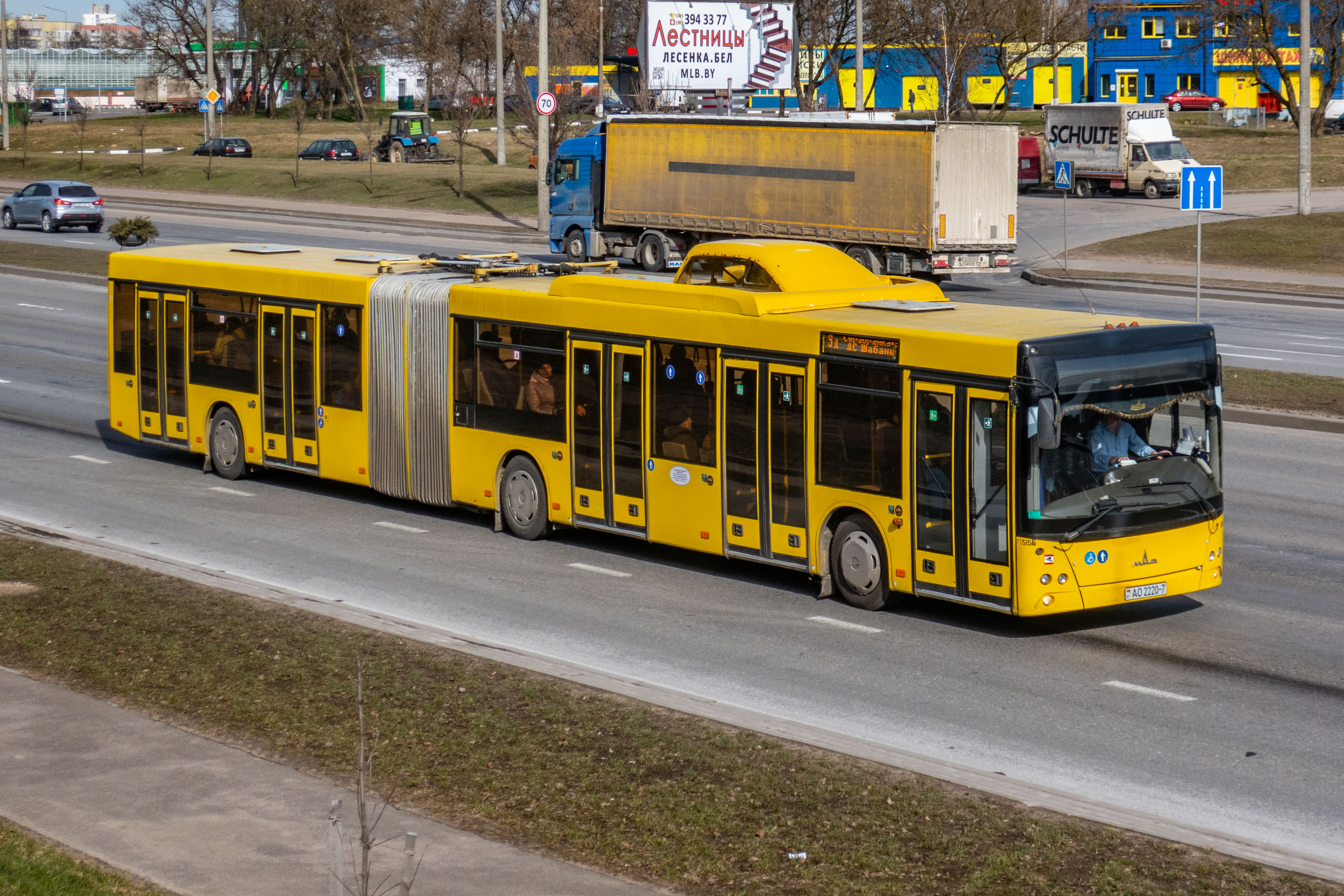
MAZ-215 bus (Minsk Automobile Plant)

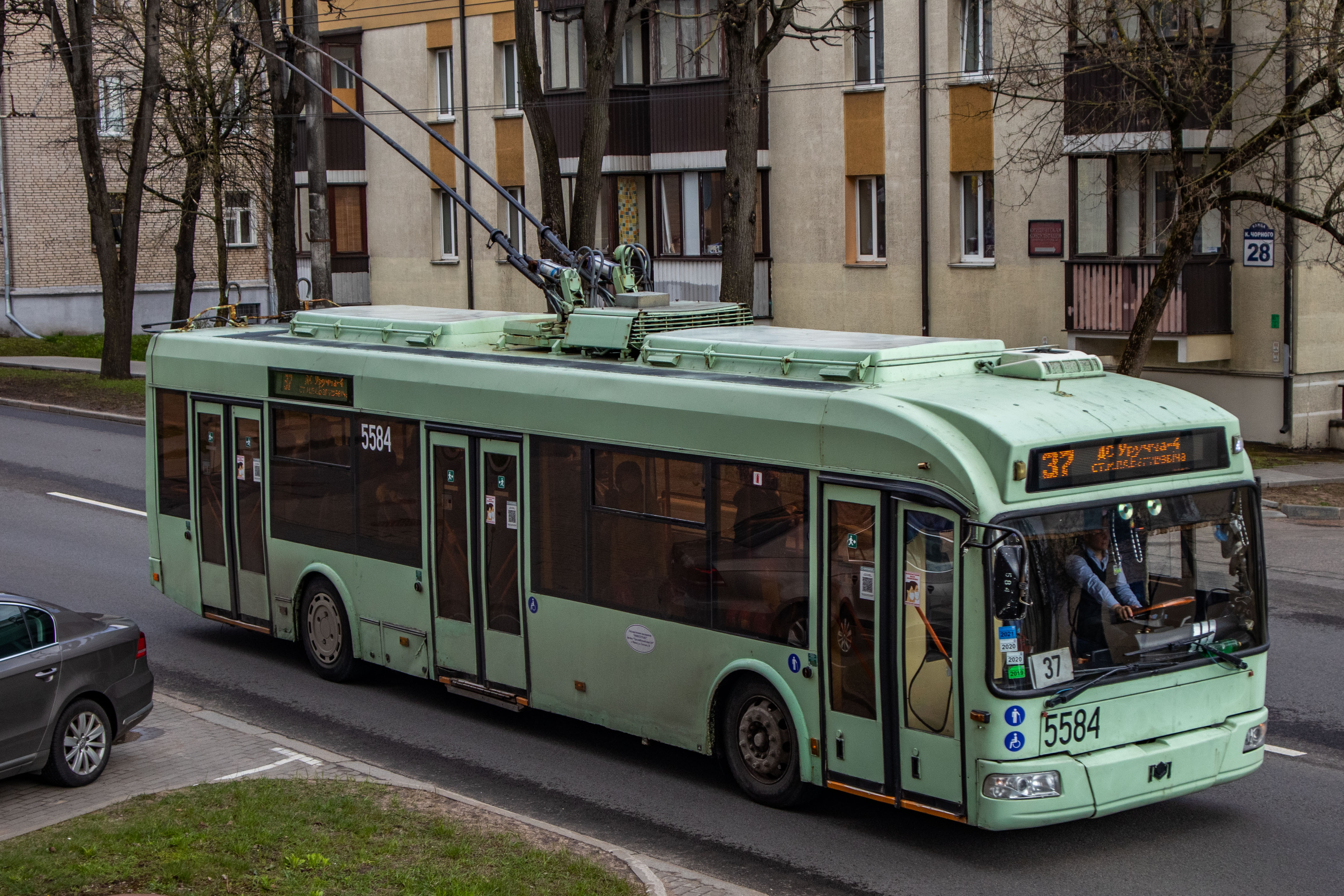
AKSM-321 trolleybus (Belkommunmash, Minsk)

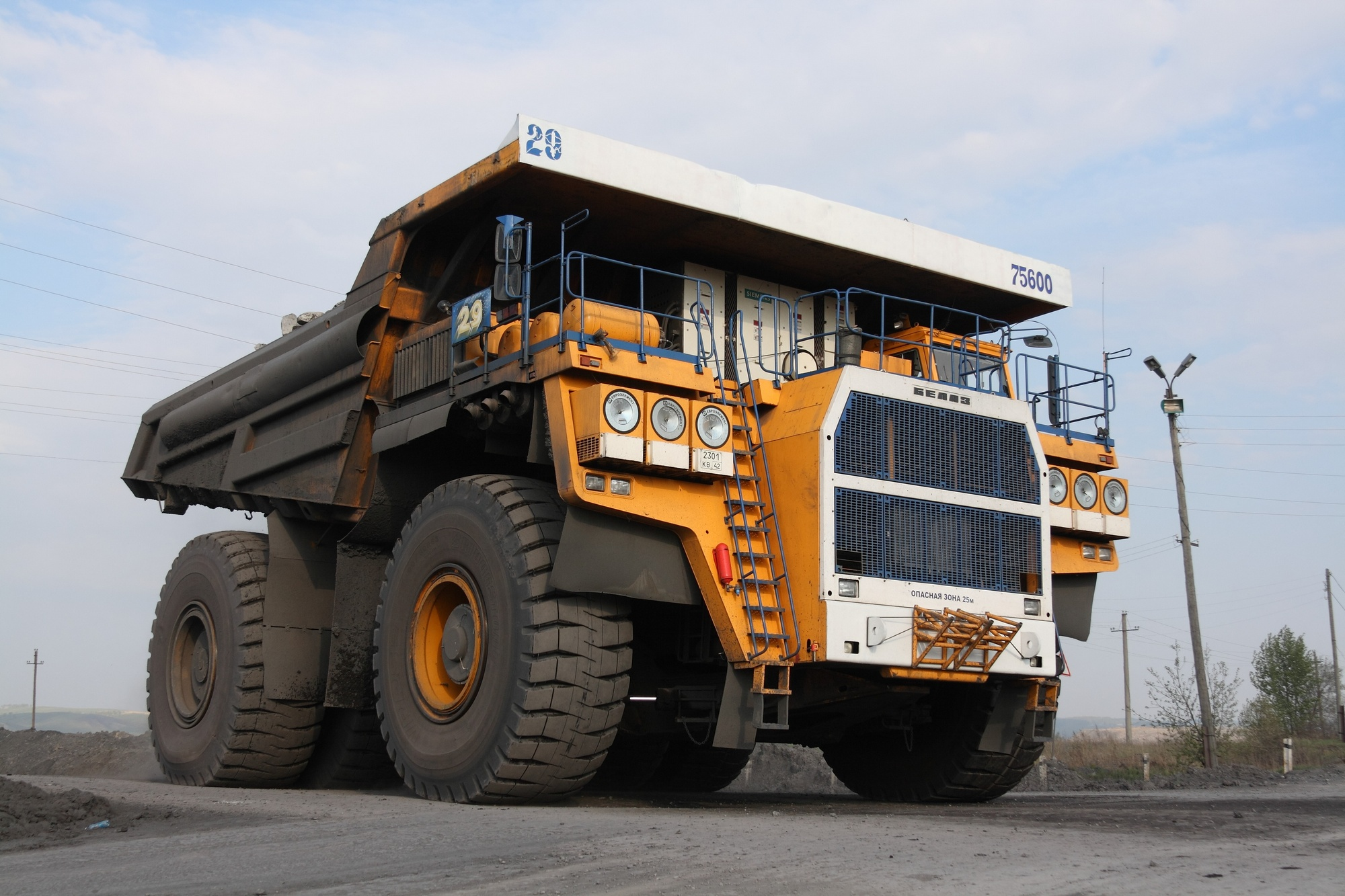
BelAZ-75600 haul truck (BelAZ, Zhodzina)

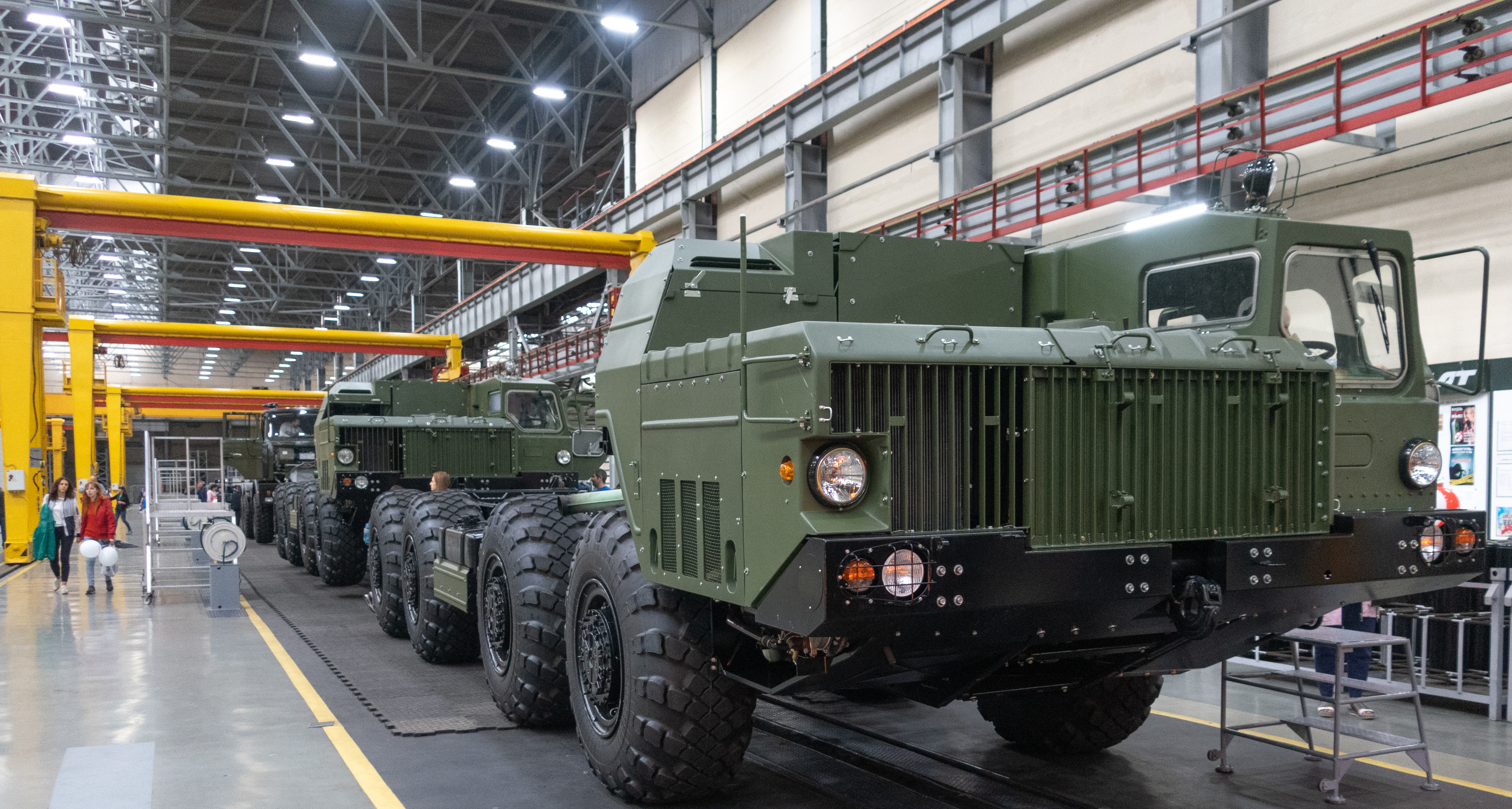
MZKT-543M (upgraded MAZ-543, Minsk wheel tractor plant MZKT)

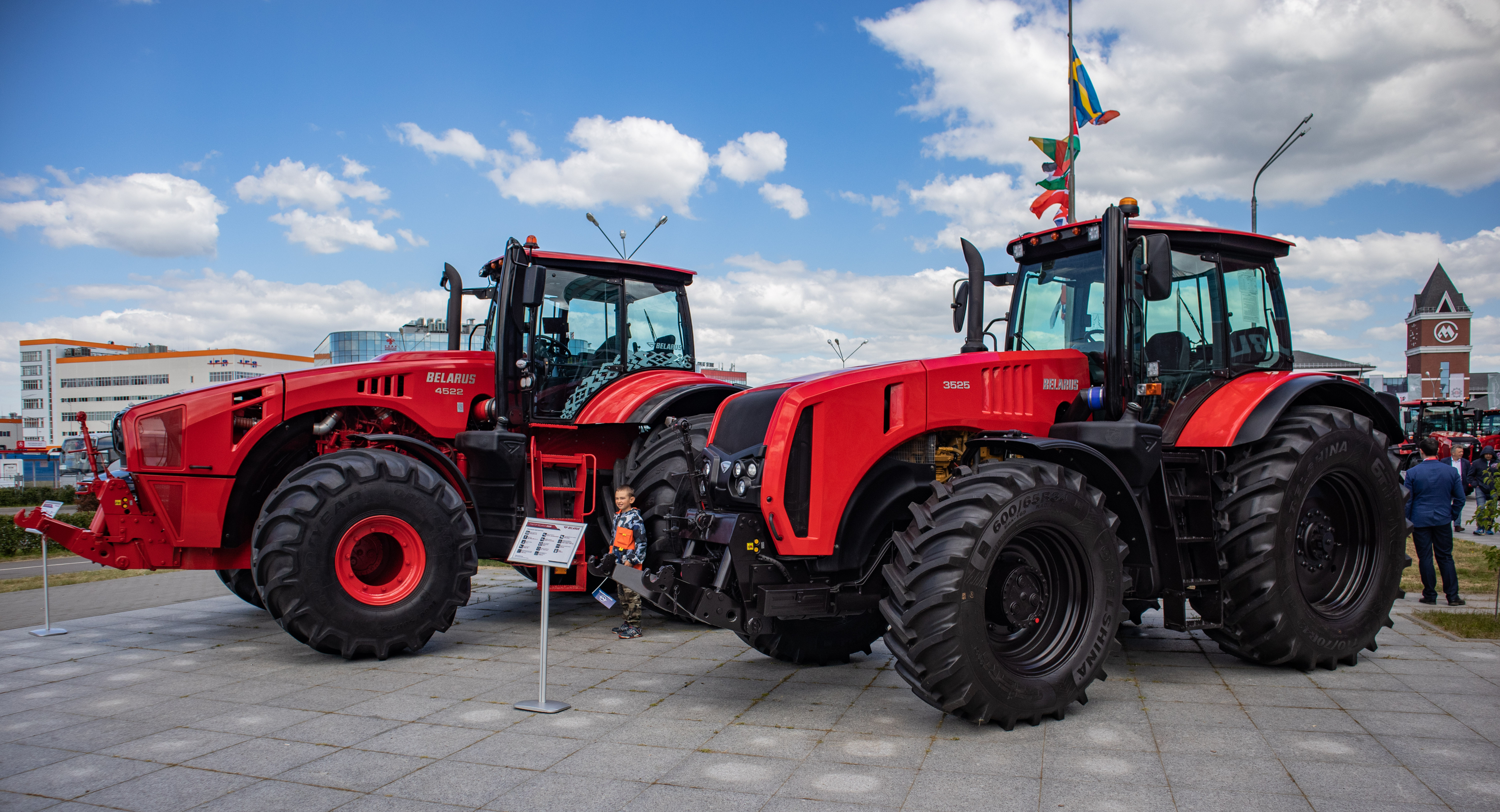
Belarus 4522 and 3525 tractors (Minsk Tractor Works)

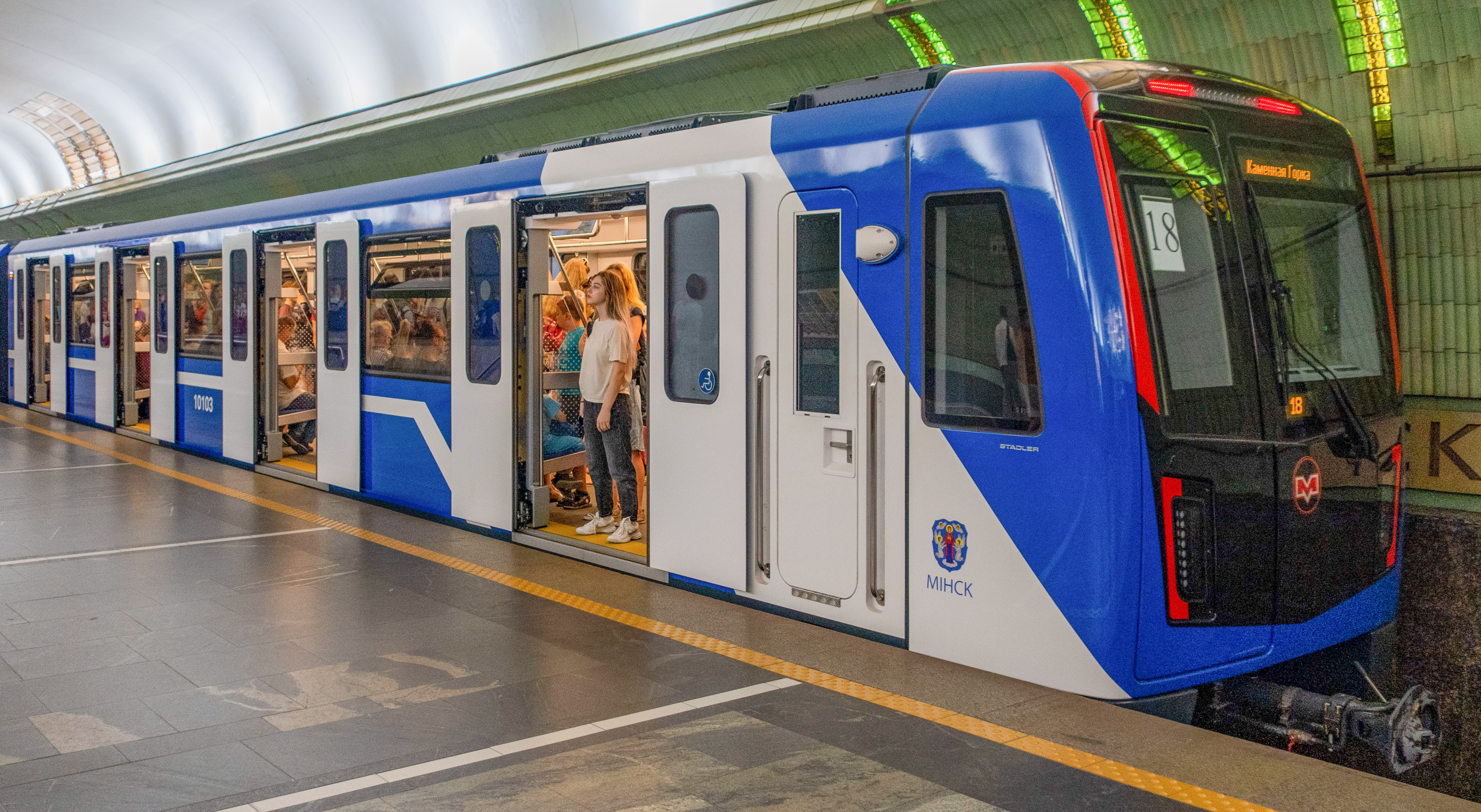
Stadler M110/111 metro train (Stadler Minsk, Fanipal)

==== Military industry ====
Belarus inherited the well-developed military industry from the Soviet era. According to the Stockholm International Peace Research Institute, Belarus was the twentieth largest exporter of major arms in a 5-year period of 2014–2018; its main clients were Vietnam, Sudan and Myanmar. Russia is another key client for the MAZ and MZKT plants.

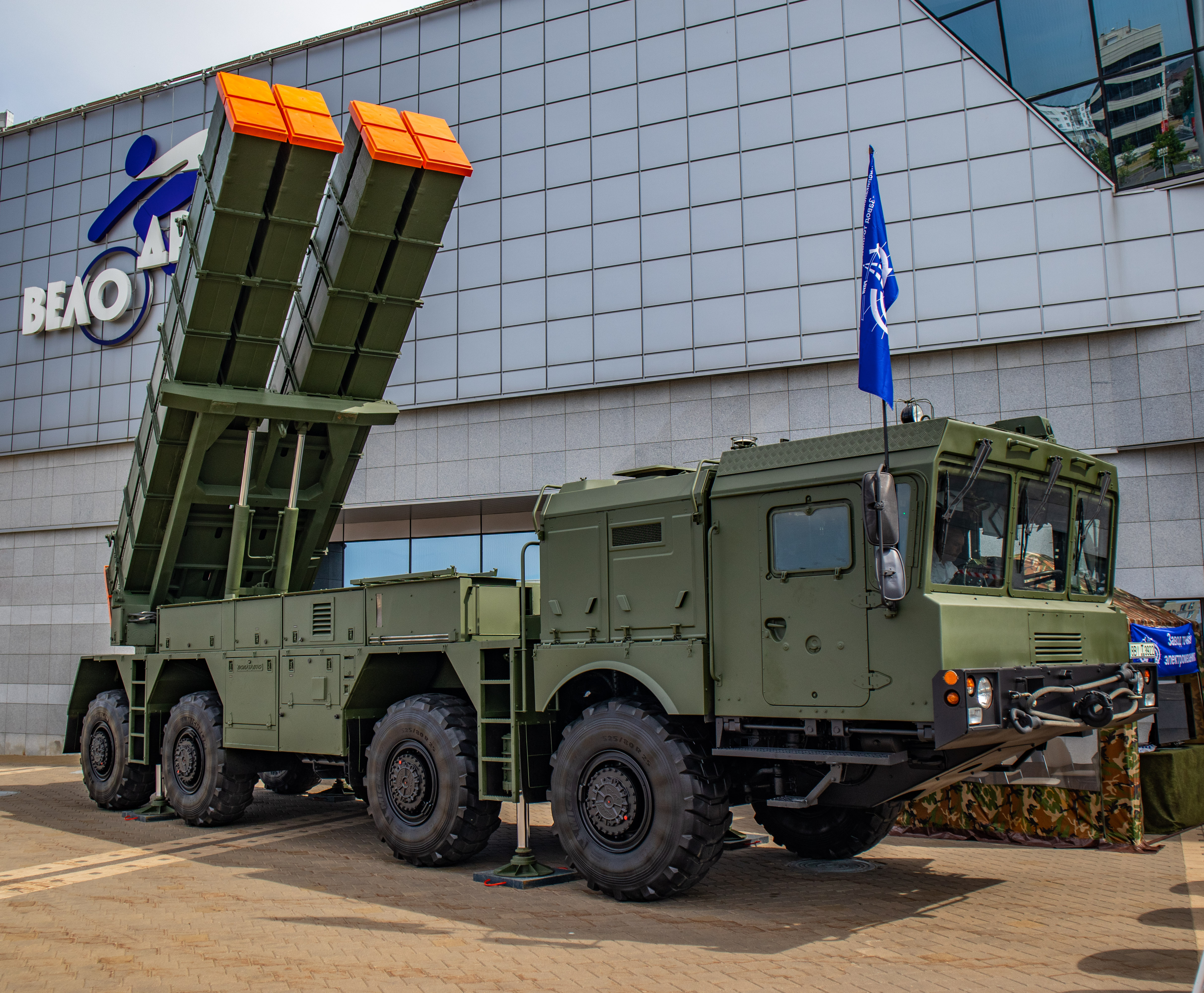
Polonez multiple rocket launcher (Chinese-designed rockets and MZKT chassis)

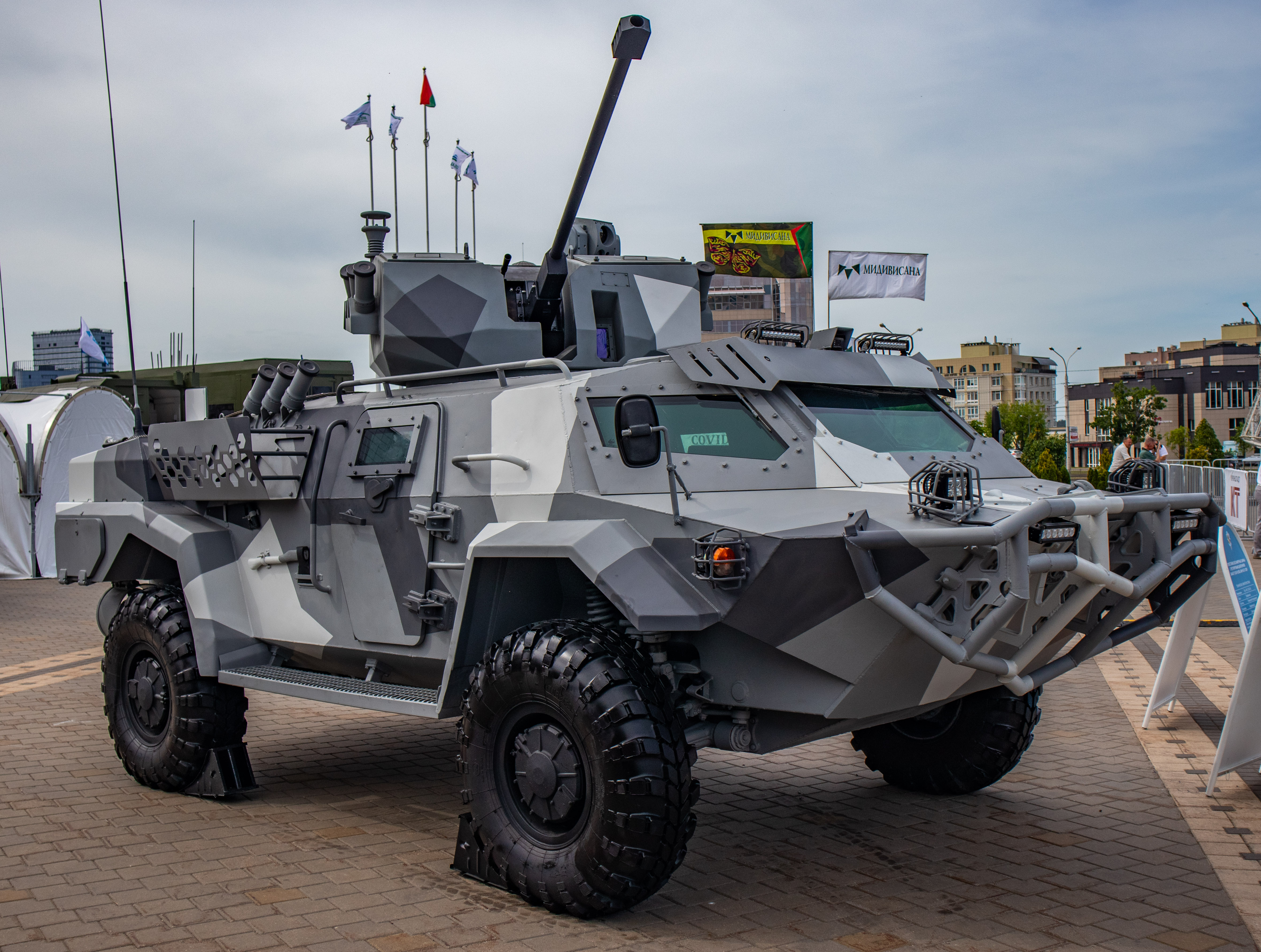
Caiman reconnaissance vehicle (140th repair plant, Barysaw)

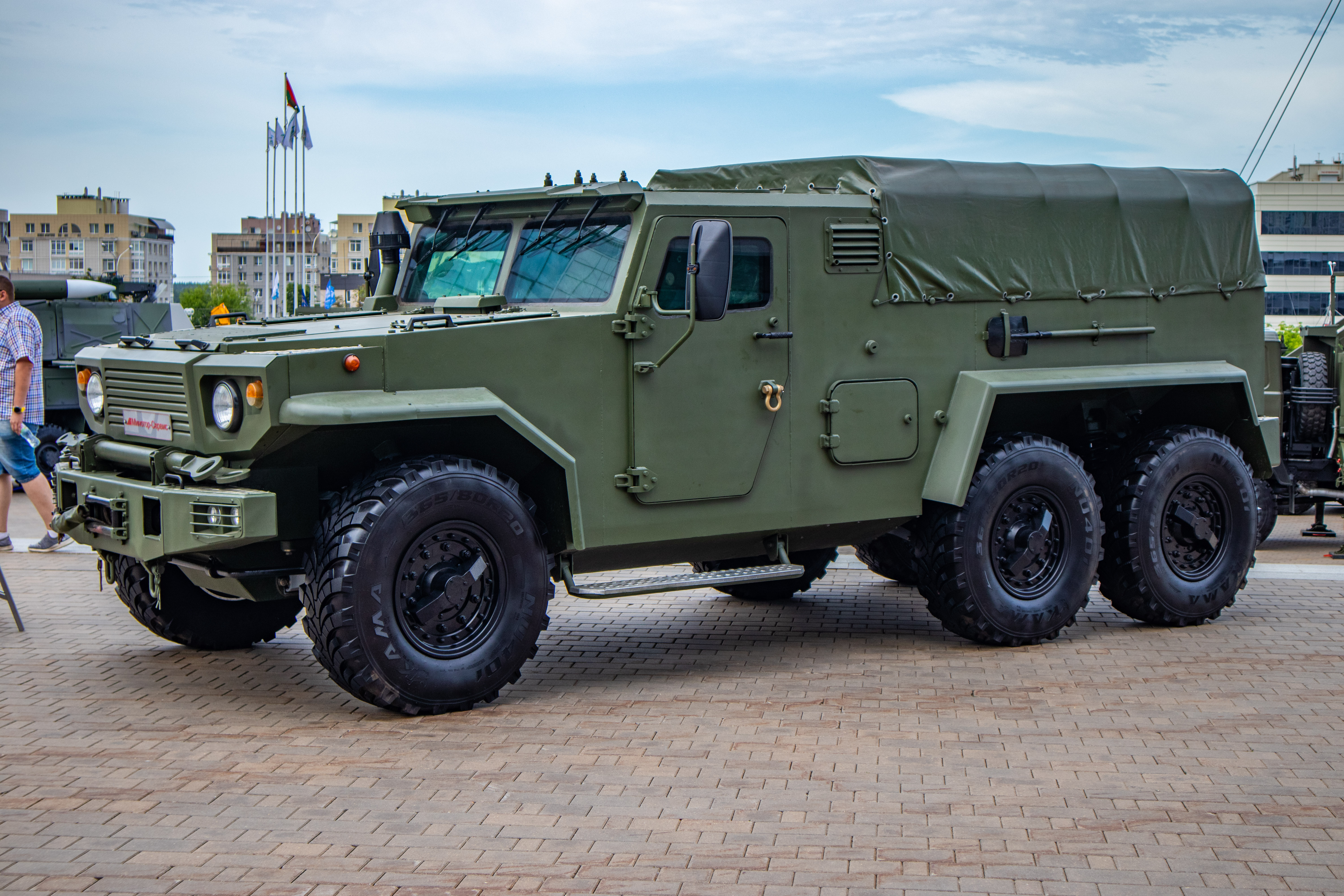
6x6 version of Vitim vehicle (Minotor-servis, Minsk)

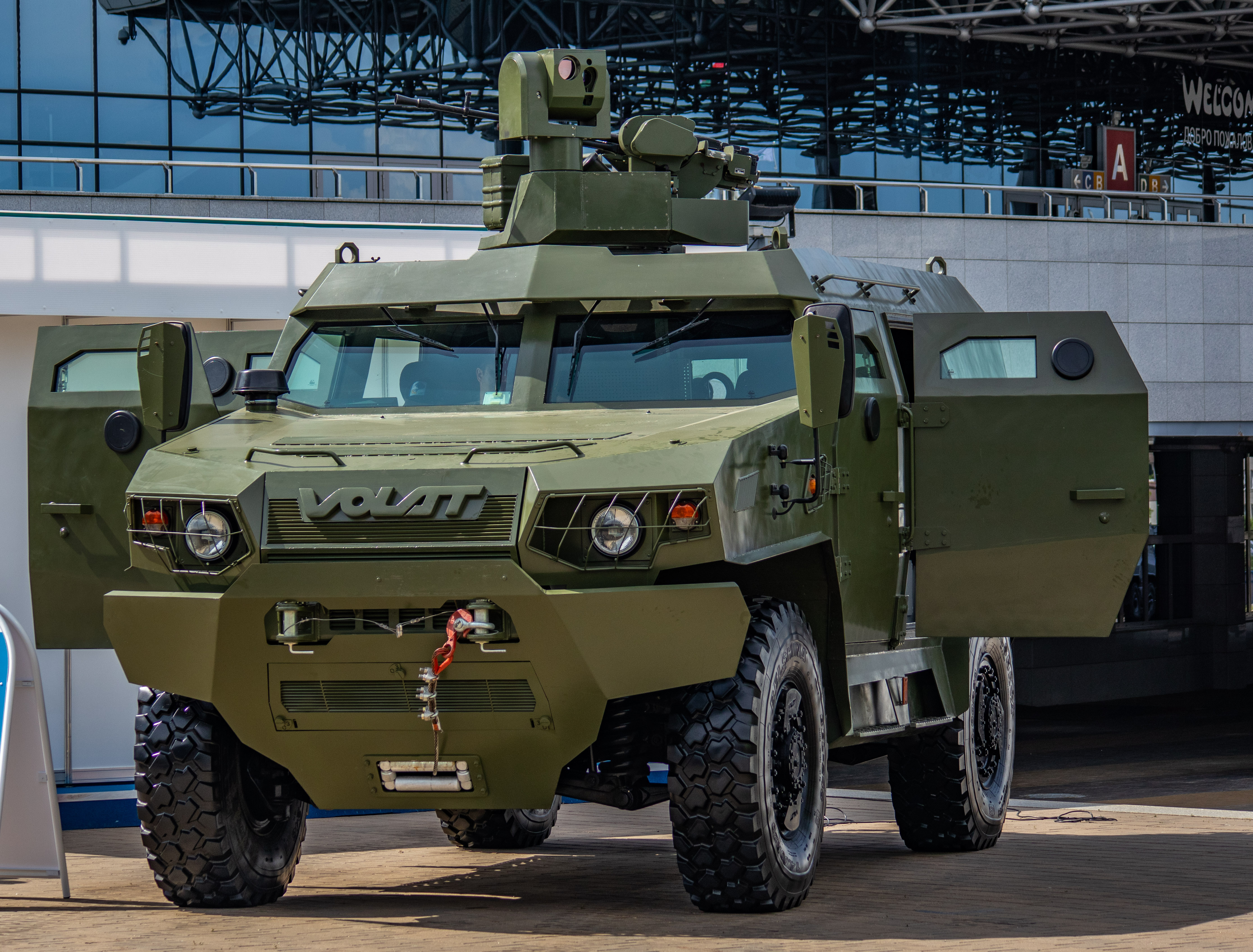
Volat V1 vehicle (MZKT)

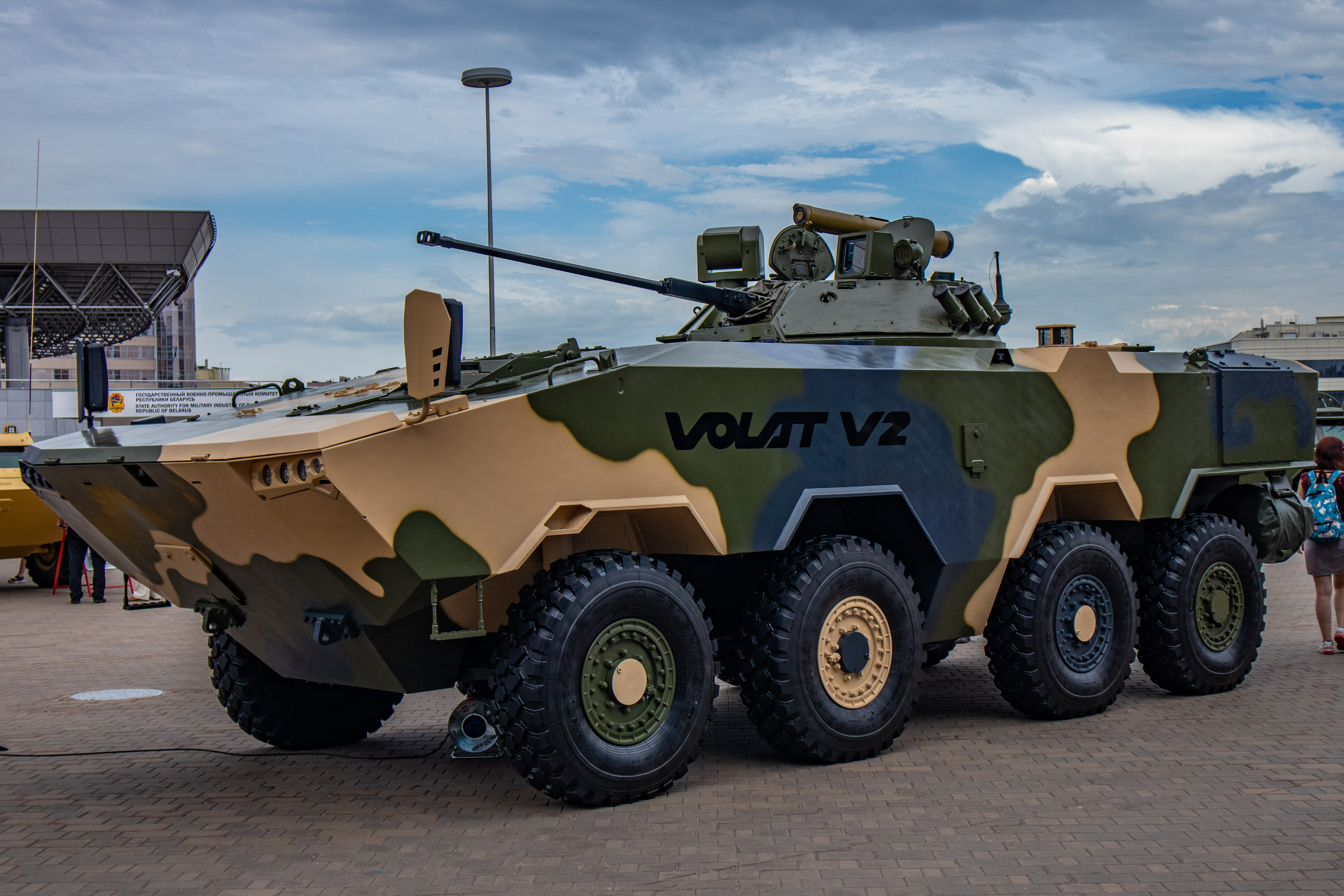
Volat V2 APC (MZKT)

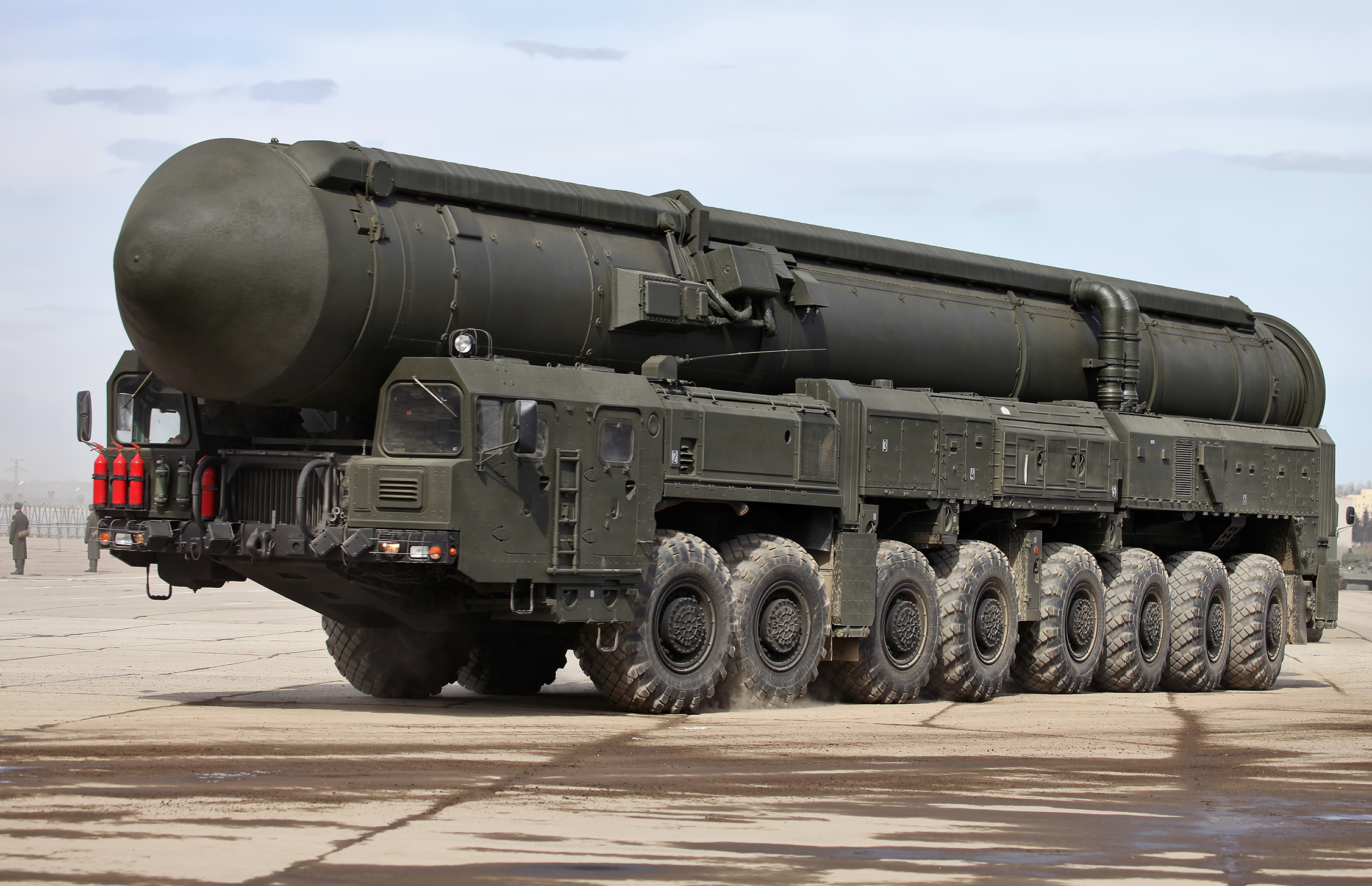
MZKT-79221 (chassis only, MZKT)

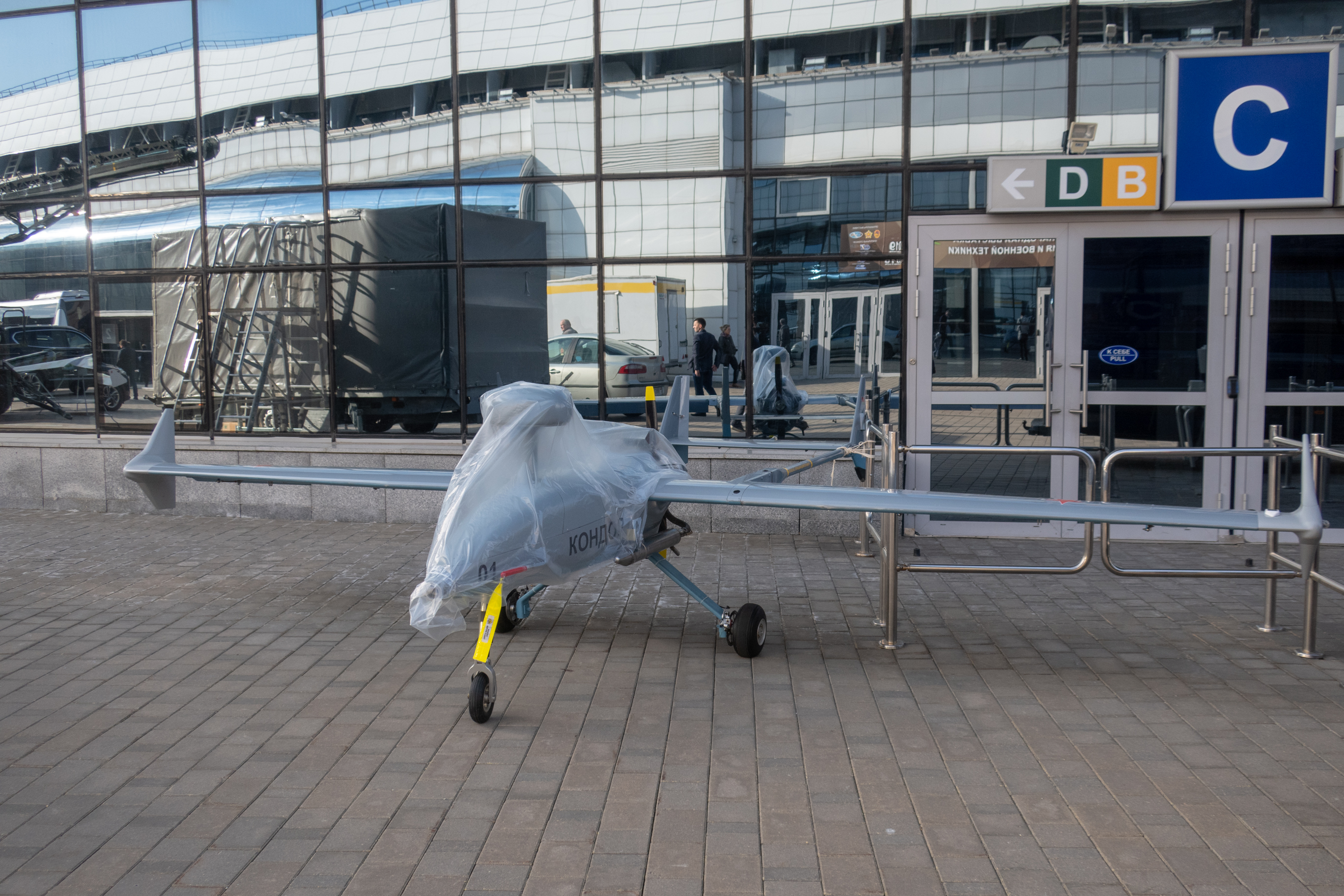
UAV Condor (558th aircraft repair plant, Baranavichy)

=== Metallurgy and manufacturing of metal products ===
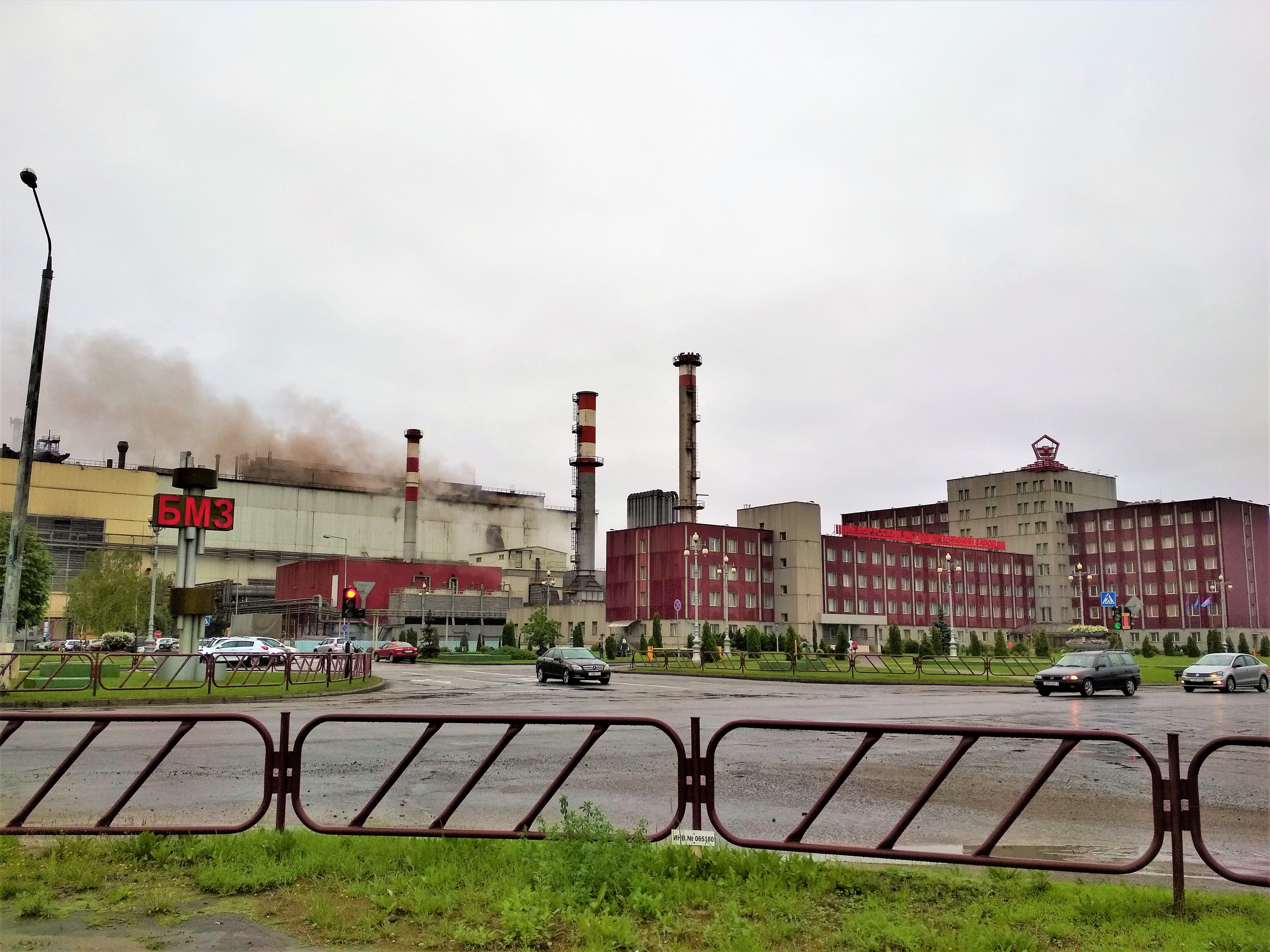
BMZ steel works

Byelorussian Steel Works (BMZ) in Zhlobin (built in the 1980s by Austrian Voestalpine company) is the biggest factory in the sector in Belarus. Other significant factories are Mogilev ironworks and Rechytsa hardware plant. 1757 companies were active in metallurgy and manufacturing of metal products (except transportation and other machinery) in 2019, they employed 57.7 thousand workers and produced Br 7888.9 million (c. US$3.7 billion) of industrial output. In the late 2010s, Austrian and German investors constructed Miory Steel (MMPZ) factory to produce rolled steel and tinplate in Miory and export much of its production.

State-owned factories in Zhlobin, Mogilev and Rechytsa are parts of Belarusian metallurgical holding company.

In 2019, Belarusian companies produced 2717.7 thousand tons of steel, 2502.8 of rolled steel, 227.2 thousand tons of steel pipes, 727 km of thermally insulated steel pipes, 392.7 thousand tons of cold drawn unalloyed steel wire, 89.2 thousand tons of steel cord.

Belarus has two notable iron ore deposits, but they aren't in use (as of 2021).

Belarusian metallurgy is export-oriented, the country was among top 10 in the world by export orientation of steel industry. In 2019, Belarus exported US$1222.8 million of iron and steel, US$939.9 million of general metal products (SITC section 69), US$206 million of non-ferrous metals.

=== Electrical appliances, communication products, electronics ===
Belarus has two major manufacturers of household appliances established in the Soviet Union — Horizont (originally a radio manufacturer later switched to production of TV sets and household appliances) and Atlant (former Minsk Refrigerator Works, later started to produce several other household appliances). Several lesser factories are operational: two Torgmash factories in Baranavichy and Grodno produce kitchen appliances (though their original specialization was appliances for catering), Brest radiotechnical plant produces electric stoves and heaters, Amkodor-BelVAR (former Minsk instrumentation factory) produces kitchen appliances and climate control appliances. A number of small private companies are also active in this sector of industry.

In 2019, Belarusian companies manufactured 815 thousand domestic refrigerators, 882 thousand microwave ovens, 392.9 thousand electric stoves, 168 thousand washing machines, 56 thousand electric meat grinders, 71 thousand electric juicers, 0.4 thousand electric irons.

Minsk electrotechnical plant (METZ named after V.I.Kozlov) manufactures electrical transformers and electrical panels, factories in Mogilev, Luninets and other cities produce electric motors for specific purposes, factories in Mazyr, Gomel, Vitebsk, Minsk and Shchuchyn produce cables. In 2019, 533.3 thousand transformers, 545.3 thousand electric motors, 78.7 thousand km of optical cables, 7952 tons of insulated winding wires were produced.

As of 2019, Belarus had two factories that produce accumulator batteries (1AK joint venture with Exide Technologies in Pinsk and Amkodor-Radian near Minsk). Third accumulator factory was built in Brest but it faced with ecological protests. In 2019, Belarusian companies manufactured 280 thousand accumulator batteries.

The only big producer of light bulbs is Brest electric lamp plant. It produces bulbs under own Belsvet brand and also under General Electric and Philips international brands. In 2019, 38 million bulbs (incandescent, discharge and other types of lamps/bulbs) were produced which was significantly less than 105 million bulbs in 2016.

Electronics and computers

Minsk was one of the centres of development and manufacturing of early Soviet computers. "Minsk" computers were manufactured mainly at Sergo Ordzhonikidze plant in Minsk (later — MPOVT; Minsk Production Group for Computing Machinery). In 1979, a printed circuit boards factory was commissioned at MPOVT. In the 1990s and 2000s, MPOVT switched to production of other production.

Integral factory in Minsk was built in the Soviet era to manufacture mid-level integrated circuits and consumer electronics. Several manufacturers of electronic products in other cities of Belarus are currently part of Integral holding company.

In 2019, 93 million diodes and transistors, and 1511 million integrated circuits were produced in Belarus.

=== Forest industry ===
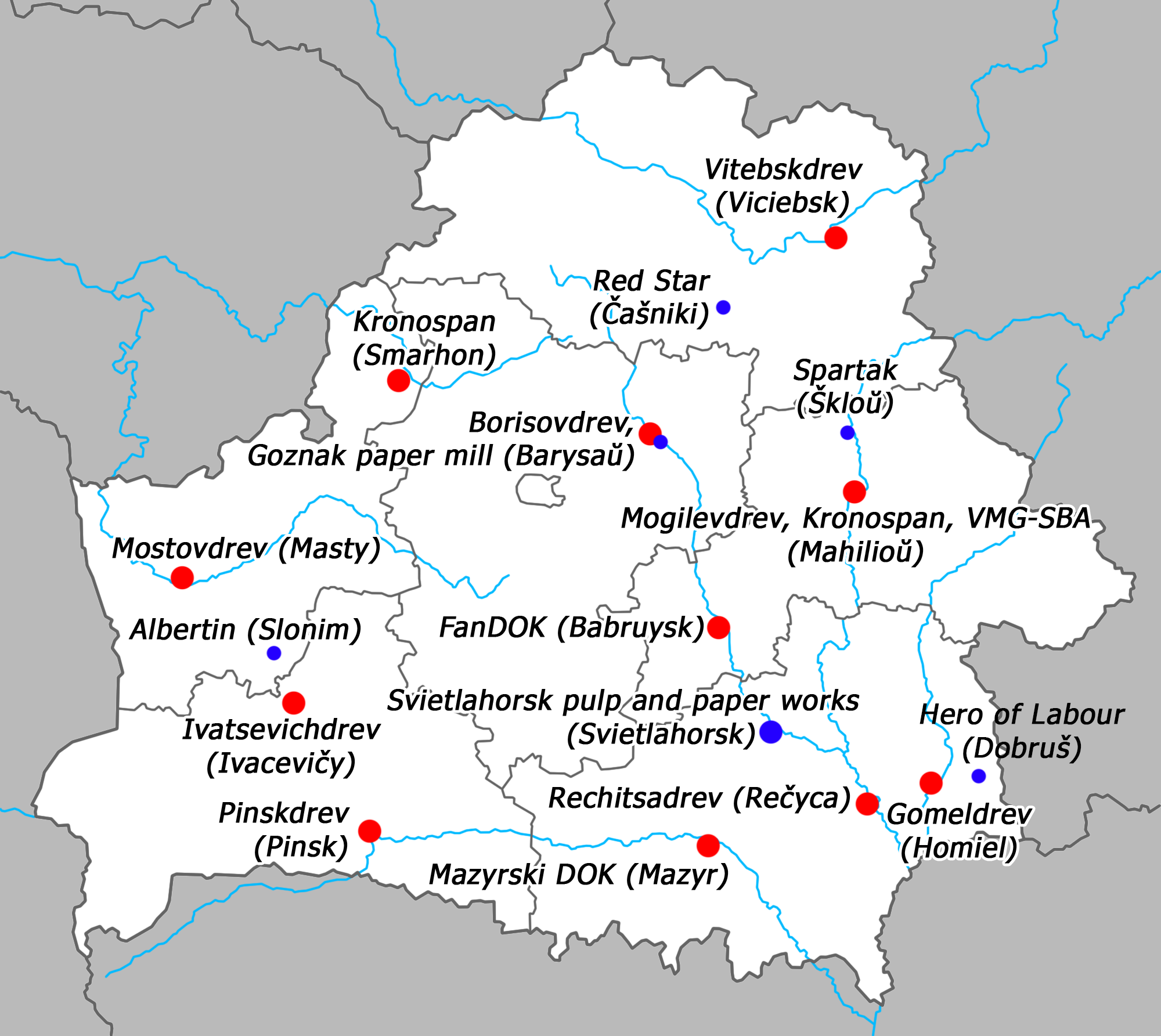
Major woodworking facilities Pulp and paper mills

Processing of timber logged in abundant Belarusian forests is a well-developed sector of Belarusian industry. State-controlled factories in this sector are managed by Bellesbumprom concern.

In 2007, the government started the modernization of 9 major wood processing factories. The total amount of investments exceeded US$1 billion. However, it led to financial degradation of the modernized factories. Lack of sales markets analysis and low technical level of some of the new equipment were named the main reasons of failed modernization in the sector. It was also reported that the modernization was imposed by the Bellesbumprom while the managers of several factories were against it. One of the main issues was a heavy (nearly two-fold) drop in particle boards and MDF prices. In 2016, these factories were united in a single state-owned holding company. In 2018, all nine modernized factories were unprofitable. In 2019, only three of the modernized factories were profitable but even they got heavy debts (Gomeldrev's debts exceeded its net profit for more than 200 times).

The biggest woodworking factory and wooden furniture producer is Pinskdrev in Pinsk. It was privatized in the 1990s but nationalized in 2011. 9 major modernized factories with a controlling stake owned by government are:

- Ivatsevichidrev (Ivatsevichy, 97.89% state-owned, 997 workers in 2016)
- Mostovdrev (Masty, 99.99% state-owned, 1527 workers in 2020)
- Rechitsadrev (Rechytsa, 99.94% state-owned in 2020, 1186 workers in 2016)
- Mogilevdrev (Mogilev)
- Gomeldrev (Gomel)
- Vitebskdrev (Vitebsk)
- Borisovdrev (Barysaw)
- FanDOK (Babruysk)
- Mazyrski DOK (Mazyr)

Besides the modernization of state-owned wood processing factories, several new plants were built by foreign investors. Austrian Kronospan built factories in Smarhon and Mogilev, Lithuanian companies VMG and SBA built another factory in Mogilev, Polish, Estonian and Spanish companies also made investments in this sector.

The biggest plant in paper industry is a Svietlahorsk cellulose and cardboard plant (CKK). In the 2010s, the government took a US$654 million loan from China to expand Svietlahorsk CKK by constructing a bleached pulp facility. Due to several problems the amount of investments increased to US$1 billion and the commissioning was postponed. The modernization was criticized for financial and ecological issues. In 2019, the contract with Chinese contractor company was terminated. Ecologists claimed that the facility was built near the city despite a very dirty technology (using sulfur and chlorine) was chosen. Locals claim that strong bad smell (presumably caused by methanethiol) strarted to spread. In 2020, the new facility was under commissioning. In February 2021, the government introduced duties on import of some of the Svietlahorsk CKK production (presumably to help the company). In June 2021, Svietlahorsk CKK made an additional issue of shares which is considered to be an indirect state support.

Medium paper mills are located in Dobrush, Shklow, Slonim, Barysaw and Chashniki. There are two wallpaper factories in Minsk and Gomel. State-owned Dobruš paper mill "Hero of Labour" was modernized in the 2010s by constructing new cardboard facility with Chinese loan. In 2018, the contract with Chinese construction company was terminated. Originally it was planned to finish the construction in 2015, but it was postponed to 2017 and later to 2020. It was finally commissioned on 1 June 2021 but the factory had to take new loans to finish the commissioning. Total amount of investments in this project was estimated at US$350 million.

In 2019, Belarus exported US$728 million of wood products (excluding furniture), US$592 million of furniture, US$225 million of paper and paperboard and other products made of pulp. Belarus is also a notable exporter of raw timber (US$686 million in 2019).

=== Building materials ===
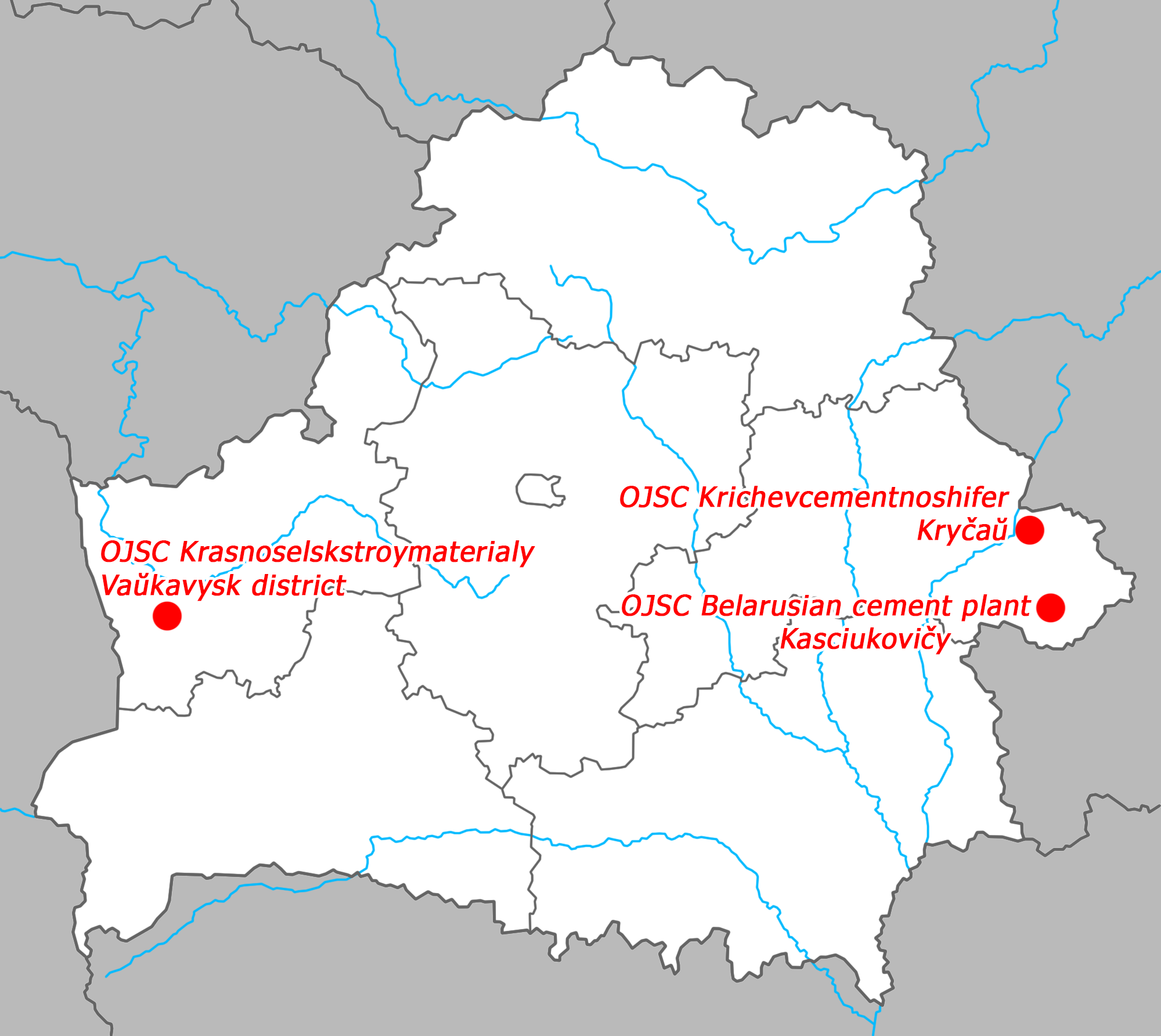
Cement factories in Belarus

During Soviet era, Belarus had only two cement plants and imported significant part of cement for construction from other republics of the USSR. Construction of the new cement plant in Kastsyukovichy started in the 1980s and was finished in the 1990s. Cement plants in Krychaw and Kastsyukovichy are 100% state-owned. The plant in Vawkavysk District was partially privatized (50% as of 2002), but later share of the state was increased to 91%. In 2012 and 2013, new production facilities built with Chinese financial and technical support were launched, but they were later found excessive due to changed market. Increased energy prices and high cost of production complicated the financial situation of the factories. The government later provided massive financial aid to these factories to help them pay off their loans. It was also reported that the quality of Chinese cement-producing equipment was lower than expected. This modernization was criticized for not taking into account any possible market changes and not analyzing the competitiveness of production. Despite the existence of plans to export the surplus of cement, it became unprofitable because it was more expensive than the cement produced in Russia.

As of 2019, three cement factories got nearly US$900 million of government support. In 2019, Alexander Lukashenko decreed that Krychaw cement plant has to repay debts in 2038–2049, Belarusian cement plant in Kastsyukovichy — in 2028–2038, Krasnoselskstroymaterialy in Vawkavysk district — in 2030–2037. They also received land tax and property tax exemptions until 2049, 2038 and 2037 respectively. Despite this financial support, all three cement factories were unprofitable in 2019.

In 2014, cement production reached it peak — 5617 thousand tons. In 2020, cement production was 4736 thousand tons.

=== Mining ===
In Belarus, mining is considered as a part of industry, while globally it's usually considered as a part of the primary sector of the economy. In 2019, 42 organizations were active. 58.1% of its production was crude oil (by Belorusneft). Belaruskali potash producer is considered as a part of chemical industry.

== Foreign trade ==
Export of industrial goods (Note: Not necessarily only Belarusian-produced goods.) amounted to US$31,991 million in 2018 and US$30,871 million in 2019. In 2015–2019, from 57% to 63% of industrial output was exported every year.

In 2021, National Statistical Committee of the Republic of Belarus stopped to publish reports about several aspects of foreign trade after EU, US, UK and other countries imposed sanctions on Belarus.

Belarusian export by sectors of manufacturing in 2019:

- Refined petroleum products — US$5548 million
- Chemical products (excluding refined petroleum products) — US$5052 million
- Food industry — US$4963 million
- Other machinery — US$2373 million
- Basic metals and metal products — US$2295.7 million
- Transport vehicles and equipment — US$1869 million
- Rubber, plastics and other non-metallic products — US$1674.5 million
- Products of wood and paper — US$1662 million
- Textiles and clothes — US$1358 million
- Electrical equipment — US$1030 million
- Other sectors — less than US$1 billion in 2019

In 2019, according to Belstat, major destinations of Belarusian export of industrial production were Eastern Europe (US$19.8 billion), Northern Europe (US$4.16 billion), Western Europe (US$2.46 billion), Southern and Central Asia (US$1.78 billion). Three main countries where industrial goods were exported in 2019 were Russia (41.5%, US$13.7 billion), Ukraine (12.6%, US$4.1 billion) and the United Kingdom (7%, US$2.3 billion), three more countries imported slightly more than US$1 billion: Germany, Poland and Lithuania. Total export of industrial goods to the European Union amounted to US$7.8 billion in 2017, US$10.2 billion in 2018 and US$8.4 billion in 2019.

Based on Standard International Trade Classification, major groups of Belarusian industrial export in 2019 were:

- Mineral fuels, lubricants and related materials — US$6821 million
- Machinery and transport equipment — US$5436.5 million
- Chemicals and related products (not included in other sections) — US$5225 million
- Manufactured goods — US$5000 million
- Food and live animals — US$4851 million
- Crude materials, inedible, except fuels — US$1274 million
- Miscellaneous manufactured articles — US$2346 million

== Sanctions and circumvention ==
A number of state-owned Belarusian factories were sanctioned by the EU, USA, UK, Canada and other countries following 2006, 2010, 2012 and 2020 elections. In 2020 and 2021, the EU imposed sanctions on several organizations, including major industrial companies:

- MAZ (automotive industry)
- MZKT (automotive industry, defense)
- BelAZ (automotive industry)
- Agat-Electromechanical plant (defense)
- 140th repair plant (defense)

On 24 June 2021, the EU introduced the sectoral sanctions that affected petroleum and fertilizer production, tobacco industry, supply of dual-purpose equipment, and access to the EU financial markets by the Belarusian government.

In 2021, USA resumed sanctions on Belarusian chemical industry (previously suspended, but not cancelled):

- Belneftekhim concern
  - Naftan (oil refinery)
  - Belshina (tire plant)
  - Grodno Azot (fertilizer plant)
  - Grodno Khimvolokno (synthetic fiber plant)
  - Lakokraska (chemical paints plant)
  - Polotsk-Steklovolokno (fiberglass plant)

USA also imposed sanctions on Grodno tobacco factory together with several non-industrial companies.

In 2020—2021, Belarusian authorities made different efforts to circumvent the international sanctions. They also hid the statistics to prevent revealing the ways used to circumvent them and track their effects. In particular, access to data regarding production and exports of the sanctioned goods became restricted to public. In October 2021, Belstat started to hide data regarding exports of tractors and trucks. Overall classified exports in January-August 2021 is estimated at USD 8.2 billion. In September 2021, Alexander Lukashenko mentioned minister of industry Petr Parkhomchik and vice prime minister Yuri Nazarov (politician) as the people who organized the circumvention of sanctions. He also accused several workers of state factories of gathering information about the ways used to circumvent the sanctions, and he threatened them with imprisonment. 13 workers from Grodno Azot fertilizer factory, Naftan oil refinery, BMZ steel mill and Belarusian Railway were arrested by the Belarusian KGB in a possible connection with this statement. It was reported that some of them were accused of state treason. At least two of them were later released.

In June 2021, Belorusneft was removed from subordination of Belneftekhim. This move was believed to be connected with the sanctions.

== See also ==
- China–Belarus Industrial Park
