= Oil shale in Belarus =

Overview of the industry in Belarus

Oil shale in Belarus is a large, but undeveloped energy resource. While the reserves have been known for decades, they remain unexplored due to oil shale's high ash and sulphur content, low heat of combustion and high cost of extraction and processing. However, depletion of conventional petroleum and natural gas reserves, as well as a high degree of reliance on imported hydrocarbons from Russia, have recently renewed interest in oil shale exploration in the country.

== Resource ==
Belarus is estimated to contain 5–11 billion tonnes of oil shale. Up to 3.6 billion tonnes of recoverable reserves are concentrated within the Pripyat Basin, occupying western Gomel, southern Minsk and eastern Brest Regions.

Oil shales are found in Podlasie-Brest Depression, Orsha Depression, Belarusian anteclise, Zhlobin Saddle and the Pripyat Basin. The main resource is located in the Pripyat Basin which covers an area of 10,000–20,000 square kilometres (3,900–7,700 sq mi) and contains oil shale of Upper Devonian to Lower Carboniferous age. Within the Pripyat Basin, two potentially exploitable deposits, Lyuban and Turov, have been identified, estimated to contain 0.9 and 2.7 billion tonnes of oil shale in place respectively. However, recoverable reserves of Turov deposit are identified to be 0.33–0.47 billion tonnes. The smaller deposits in the other parts of the country were found to be of negligible economic value.

Belarusian oil shales contain 10–28% of organic matter, their thermal energy of combustion is 4.2–9.5 MJ/kg, while the ash content ranges from 58 to 87%. Due to these properties, Belarusian oil shale cannot be burned directly for power generation; the rock must first undergo the process of pyrolysis, which results in production of shale oil, oil shale gas and other factions that can then be used like the conventionally produced hydrocarbons. Furthermore, a significant depth of seams (64–514 m) excludes the possibility of open-pit mining, adding to the cost of production. For these reasons, fossil fuel extraction in Belarus has been limited to the more easily accessible and cheaply produced conventional oil and gas. Though this was insufficient for the total energy needs of the republic, additional resources were supplied from elsewhere in the Soviet Union.

== History ==
In 1963, oil shale was discovered in the Pripyat Basin, Minsk and Gomel Regions. The Pripyat Basin has been extensively studied during the 1970s–1980s, while the smaller deposits in the other parts of the country were found to be of negligible economic value. Unlike nearby Estonia with its large reserves, where extensive oil shale industry was constructed, the Belarusian deposits were deemed inexpedient to develop.

After the Soviet collapse, the newly independent Belarus became highly reliant on imported hydrocarbons from Russia, while the production of domestic oil and gas peaked in the 1970s and has been steadily declining ever since. As of 2010, relations with Russia have deteriorated significantly, largely, due to numerous energy disputes. As a part of its energy security, Belarus has renewed interest in oil shale exploration. In December 2010, Belarus companies Belaruskali, BelorusNeft and Belgorkhimprom established a joint venture for the oil shale development. International tender was announced in March 2011.

== Development perspectives ==
One of its main obstacles is the problem of complex utilization of large volumes of waste products. It has been suggested to use the oil shale ash in production of concrete and ceramics, as well as in soil liming. In 2010, the Belarusian government decided on a construction of an oil shale processing plant, though financing of the project remains in question: a Luxembourgian company withdrew from the endeavour, forcing Belarus to start negotiations with the Chinese investors. Belarus also seeks to build cooperation with Estonia, which has one of the most developed oil shale industries in the world.
