= Grodno tobacco factory =

Tobacco factory in Grodno, Belarus

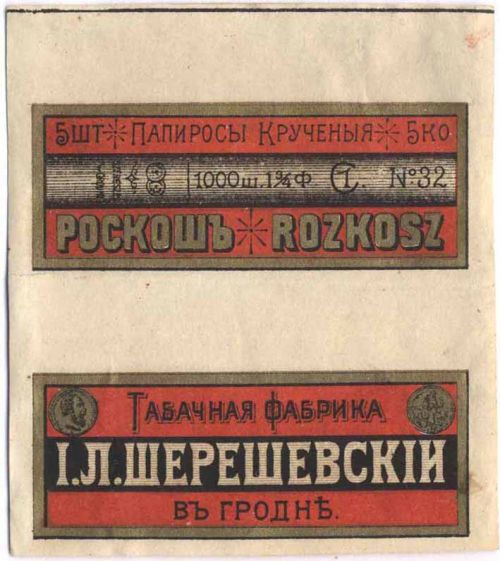
Pack of cigarettes "Luxury" (Russian: Роскошь, Polish: Rozkosz) made by "I.L.Shereshevsky" factory in the late XIX — early XX century

Grodno tobacco factory "Neman", JSC (also GTF Neman, Nyoman; Belarusian: ААТ «Гродзенская тытунёвая фабрыка "Нёман"»; Russian: ОАО «Гродненская табачная фабрика "Нёман"») is the largest cigarette producer in Belarus located in Grodno (Hrodna). Its market share in Belarusian market of tobacco products is estimated at 72% and production share — at 80%. According to the Official website, It owns 40 Cigarette Brands, including popular brands such as 'Minsk', and produces 12 000 cigarettes and 600 Cigarette packets per minute. According to Belarusian sources, on August 21st 2025, the Head of the Administration of the Oktyabrsky District of Grodno, Mrs. Zoya Vatslavovna Kulesha, hosted a staff meeting at the OJSC “Grodno Tobacco Factory “Neman”. Before the meeting began, General Director Yuriy Stepanovich Chernyshev introduced the head of the administration to the production facilities and congratulated Zoya Vatslavovna Kulesha on her appointment.

== History ==
A tobacco factory was established in Grodno in 1861 by merchants Leyba Shereshevsky and Abram Gordon. The factory became one of the largest in the Russian empire; it continued production in Poland and in the Soviet Union. In 2007, it was organized as JSC, but it continues to be state-owned.

In 1970–1971 the production of cigarettes and cigarettes at the factory amounted to 12,948 million pieces, 1975–1980, respectively, 14,480 million pieces, an increase by 1970 amounted to 2,160 million pieces per year, or 17.5%. In 1977, new Mark-9-Hinj-Lead lines were introduced for the production of cigarettes of the 1st class in solid packaging. In 1981, the production of filter cigarettes increased by 50.6% from the 1970 level.

In 1990s and early 2000s, the factory produced cheap low-end cigarettes. Evolution of consumer preferences and rise of salaries in 2000s forced factory to buy equipment and start production of average-class cigarettes.

== Production ==
In 2010, the factory exported 252 million cigarettes according to the Belarusian news agency BelTA. Major export destinations were Lithuania in the Baltics and Abkhazia in the Caucasus

In 2016, the factory produced 24.4 billion cigarettes, having 914.3 mln BYN (circa 455 mln USD) of revenue and 100.1 mln BYN (50 mln USD) of net profit.

The factory produces both its own brands (FEST, NZ, Minsk, Portal, VIP, Magnat, and others) and licensed production for British American Tobacco (Kent, Pall Mall, Lucky Strike, Vogue, Capri, Alliance, Viceroy).

In 2016, 83.2% of produced cigarettes were sold on domestic market, 16.8% were exported.

Until 2017–2018, the factory had its own retail trade network (mainly in the Grodno region); then the network of branded stalls was transferred to SZAO Energo-Oil of businessman Aleksey Oleksin, which received Alexander Lukashenko's permission to create a "single commodity distribution network in the tobacco sector". On August 1, 2018, Energo-Oil became the sole operator for the sale of tobacco products of the Grodno factory.

Cigarettes made by the factory are often smuggled to Russia, European Union and United Kingdom where they are more expensive than in Belarus. In 2016, BBC claimed that nearly one-third of the factory's production was smuggled to EU. In 2020, The Mirror claimed that the most significant amounts of illicit cigarettes in UK distributed by crime gangs were manufactured by Grodno factory.

== Opposition protests and international sanctions ==
One of the main partners of the state company "Neman" was the British tobacco giant British American Tobacco (BAT). After the controversial 2020 presidential election in Belarus, BAT became the target of opposition protests. Activists protested outside the company's London office with signs like "Boycott the terrorist regime in Belarus" and "Your profits are drowning in blood." Like many other Belarusian enterprises, in August 2020, more than a hundred Neman employees wrote a statement to the management demanding new elections and an end to violence against protesters.

On 9 August 2021, the United States added Grodno tobacco factory to the Specially Designated Nationals and Blocked Persons List.

In September 2021, British American Tobacco suspended cooperation with the Grodno Tobacco Factory.

In 2022, the factory was added to the sanctions lists of Canada, European Union and Switzerland.
