= Ford Union =

Former joint venture in Belarus

- Native name: Форд-Юніён
- Industry: Automotive
- Founded: July 1997
- Defunct: July 2000; 26 years ago
- Headquarters: Apčak, Belarus
- Area served: Great Britain, Eastern Europe and CIS
- Key people: Alan Batty (CEO)
- Products: Automobiles
- Owner: Ford Motor Company: 51%; Belarusian government: 26%; Lada-OMC: 23%

The Ford Union (Belarusian: Форд-Юніён) was a joint venture of the Ford Motor Company, the Russian Lada importer Lada-OMC and the Belarusian government. It was located in Apčak near the city of Minsk in Belarus. Ford invested a capital of US$10,000,000 for building the plant. The company existed from 1997 up to 2000 when it was closed due to low sales.

The Ford Union was not a manufacturer, it was only an assembler of SKD kits. The vehicles assembled by the Belarusian plant can be identified by the manufacturer code Y4F on the start on the VIN and an R on the eleventh position for the plant identification.

The plant gained attention on 23 July 1997 as Belarusian president Alexander Grigoryevich Lukashenko was invited to a press conference with five strategically selected foreign journalists to discuss a predicted failure which later proved true.

== Model overview ==
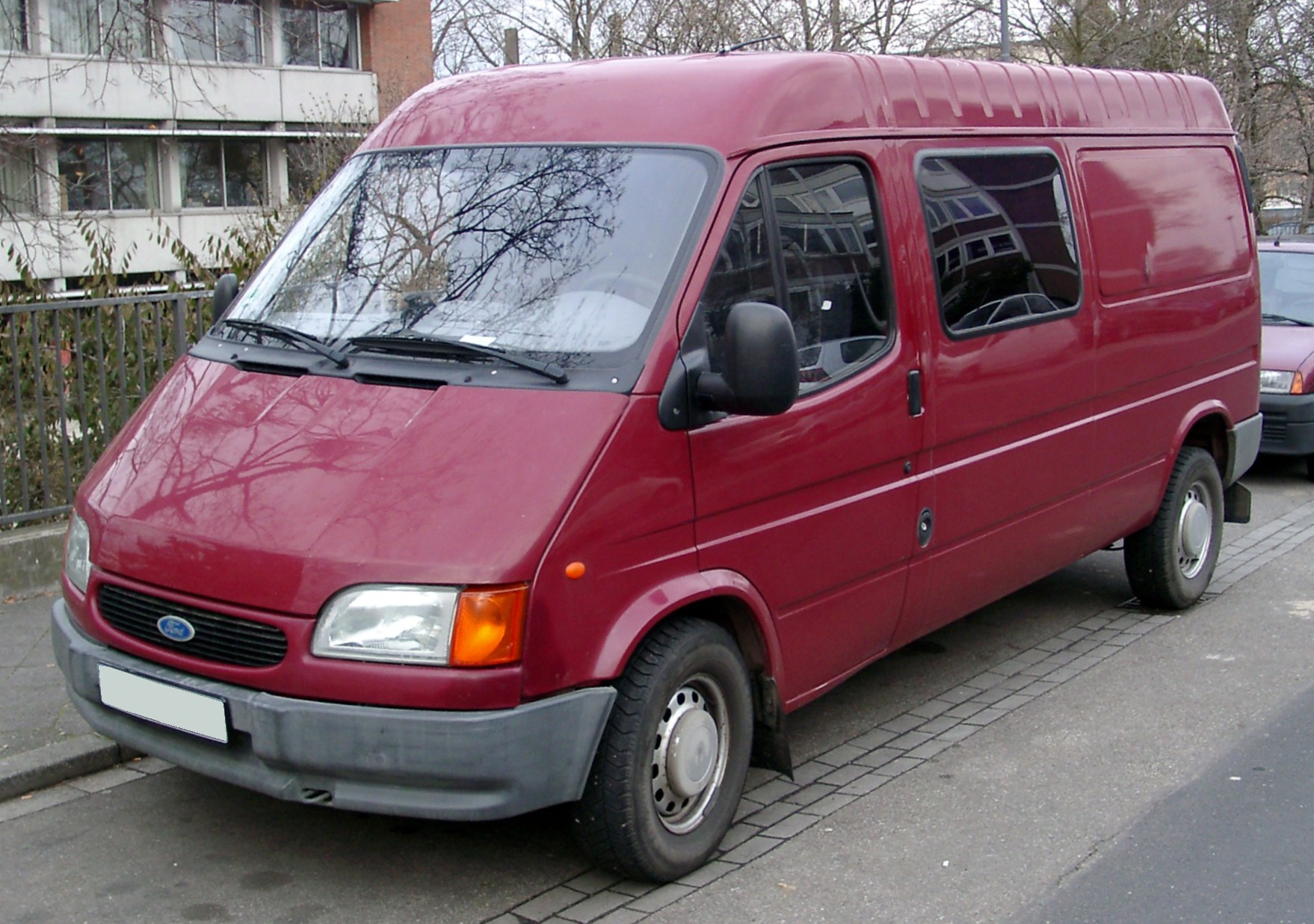
Ford Transit
1997–2000

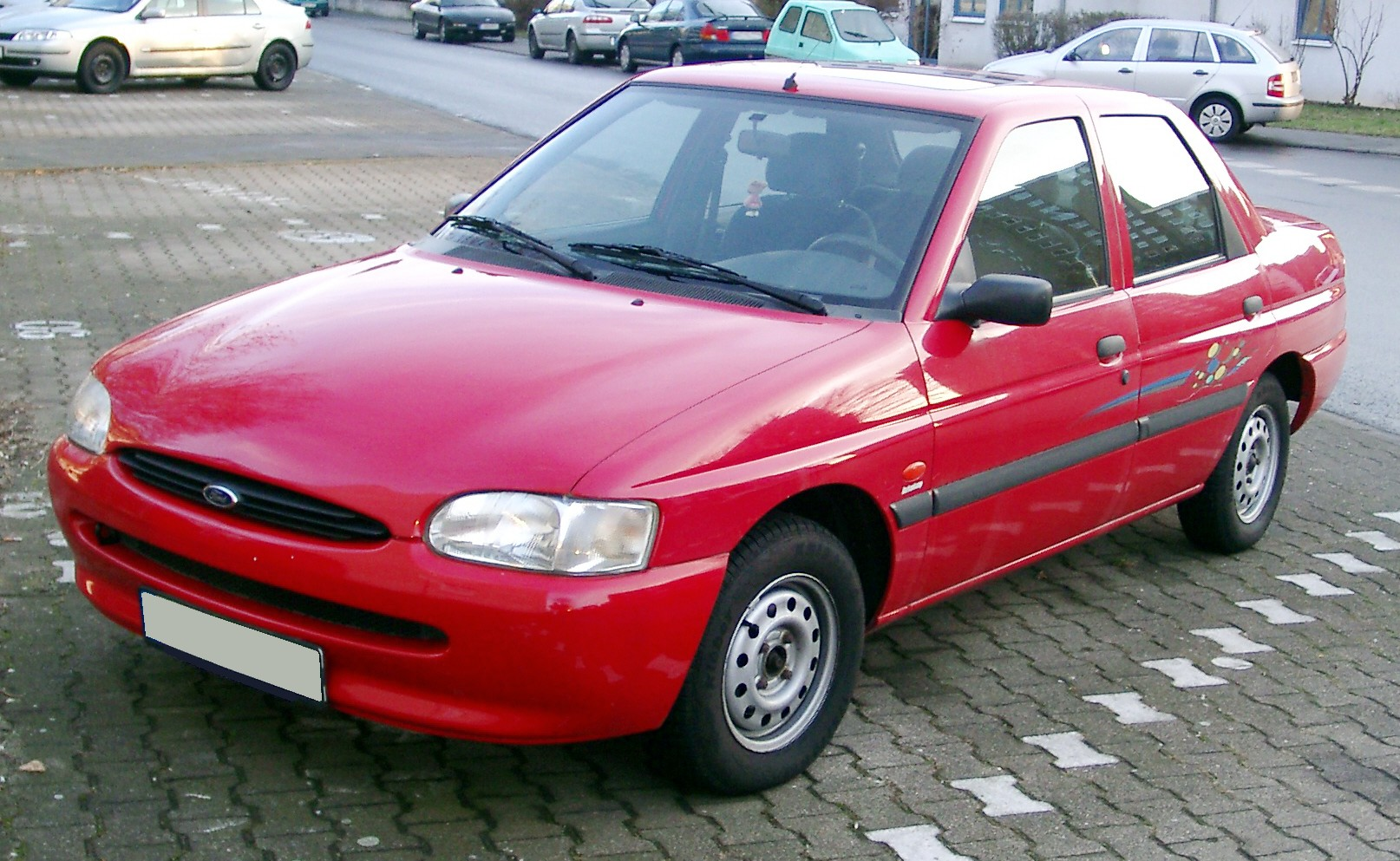
Ford Escort
1997–2000

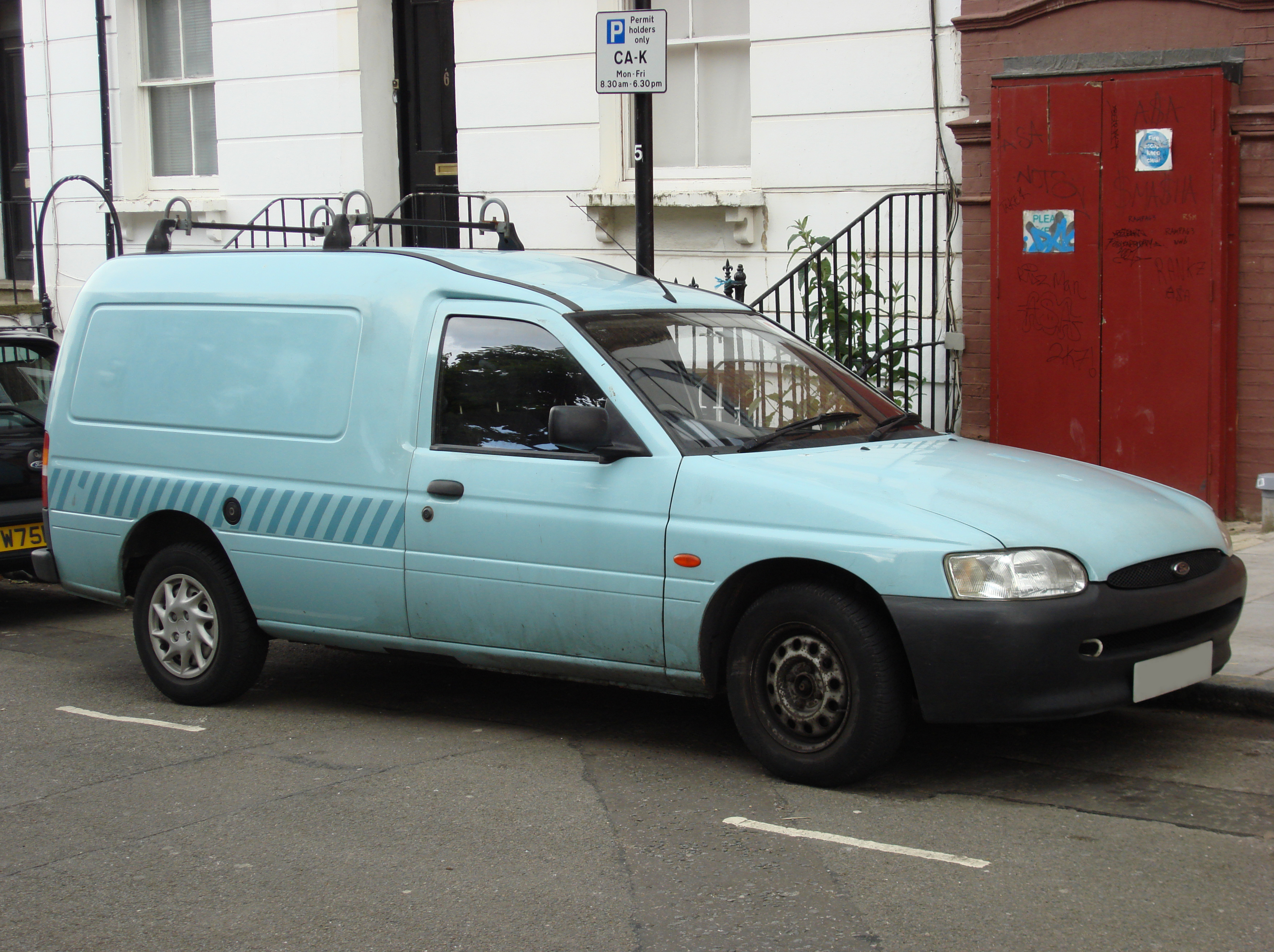
Ford Escort Courier
Ford Escort Van (GB)
Ford Express (RUS)
1997–2000
