= MZKT =

Belarusian vehicle manufacturer

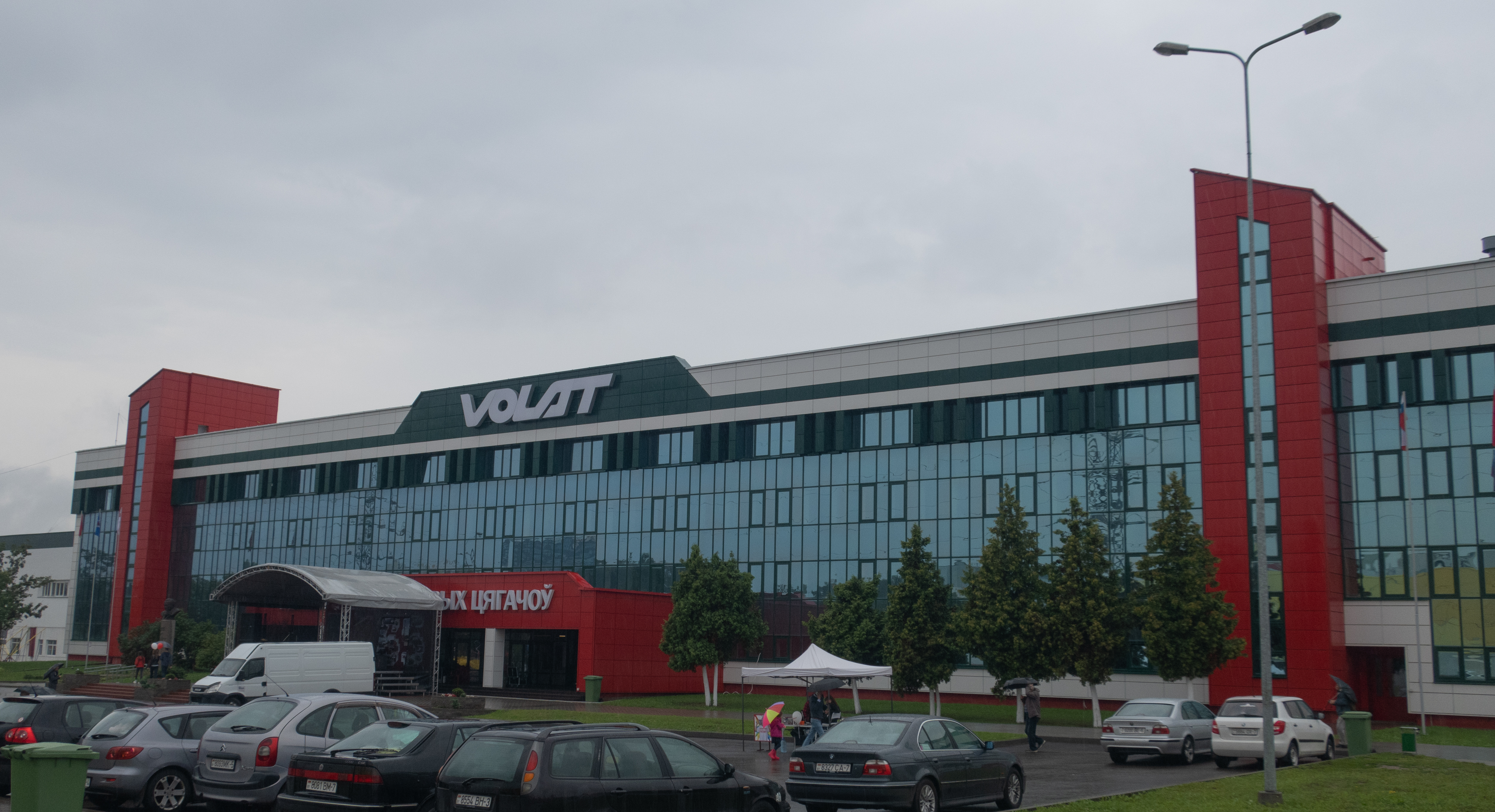
- MZKT entrance building
- Industry: Armored vehicles, heavy trucks
- Founded: 23 July 1954
- Headquarters: Minsk, Belarus
- Website: www.mzkt.by

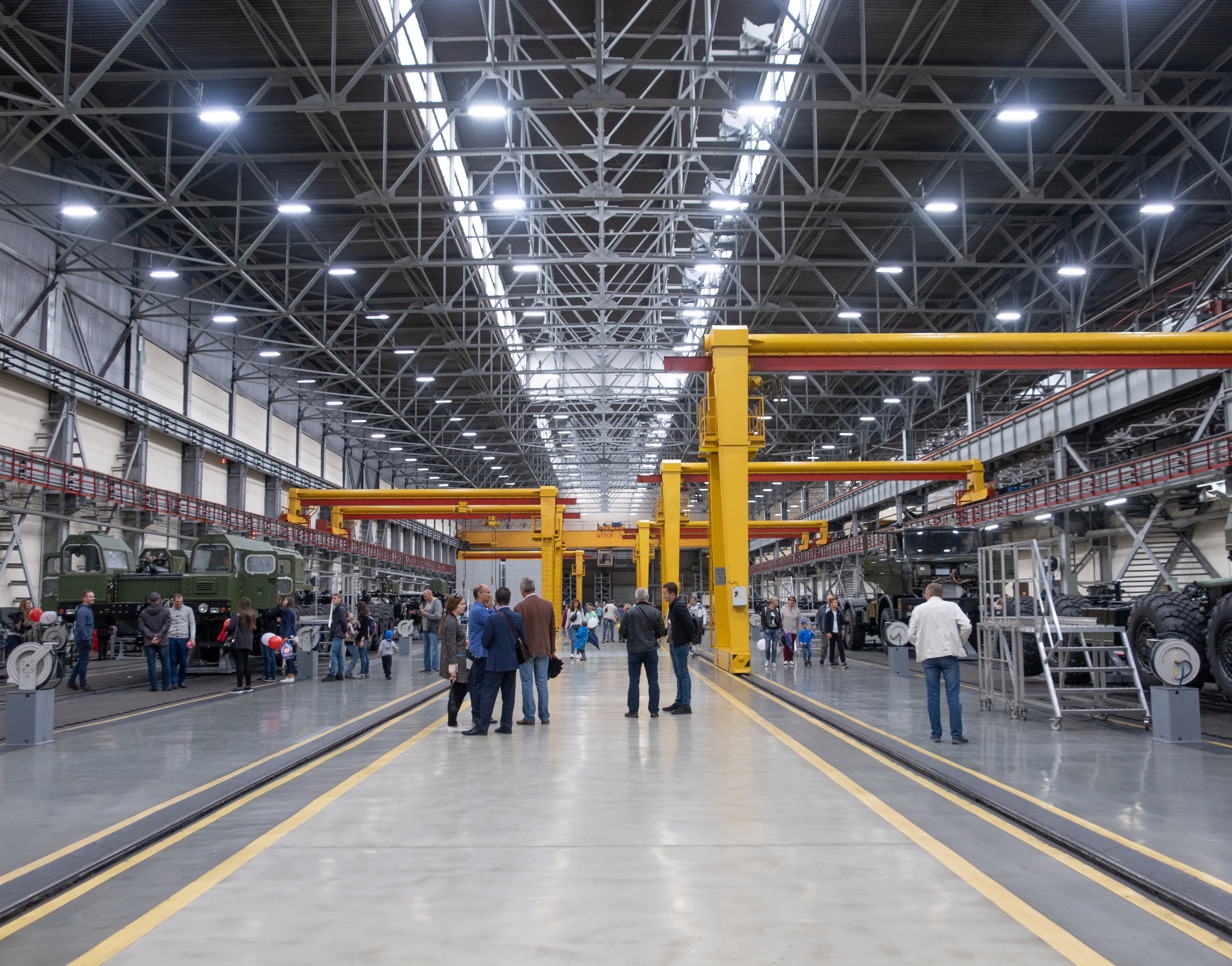
Assembly shop

MZKT (МЗКТ or МЗКЦ, Belarusian: Мінскі завод колавых цягачоў, Russian: Минский завод колёсных тягачей, Minsk Wheel(ed) Tractor Plant (MWTP)) is a manufacturer of heavy off-road vehicles, especially military trucks, based in Minsk, in Belarus; it was formerly a division of MAZ. MZKT civilian trucks are branded VOLAT (Belarusian: волат, literally means Giant). MZKT specializes in the production of on-road and off-road heavy-duty vehicles and trailers for them, as well as special wheeled chassis for installation of various equipment for enterprises and transport organizations of the construction, oil and gas and engineering industries.

== History ==
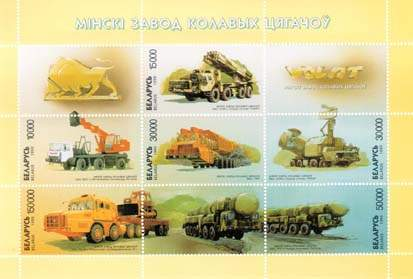
1999 Belarus stamp set commemorating MAZ.

In 1954, MZKT, the Minsk Wheeled Tractor Plant, was founded to develop artillery tractors; it then developed a series of heavy weapons transporters for the military of the USSR, including heavy offroad trucks such as the MAZ-537 and MAZ-7310. It was a division of Minsk Automobile Plant (known as MAZ). In 1991, MZKT was spun off into a separate company; its former parent, MAZ, continues to make a broader range of heavy vehicles.

In 1992, military orders slowed, and MZKT attempted to adapt its products to civilian uses, such as mining trucks and crane carriers.

In 2020 it was said that the MZKT was the primary supplier for the chassis of such Russian army vehicles as the launcher for the Topol-M because the domestic Russian products are of comparatively low quality.

== Products ==
Many post-independence MZKT trucks continued to use a MAZ cab which resembled the Iveco Turbostar cab; starting in 2010 these were replaced with Belkarplastik cabs which resembled the 5th generation Isuzu Forward, which are also used by Yarovit trucks. The civilian brand of the group Volat manufacturers tractor trucks, ballast tractors and trailers for transportation and commercial use.

=== Military vehicles ===
==== MZKT-6922 ====
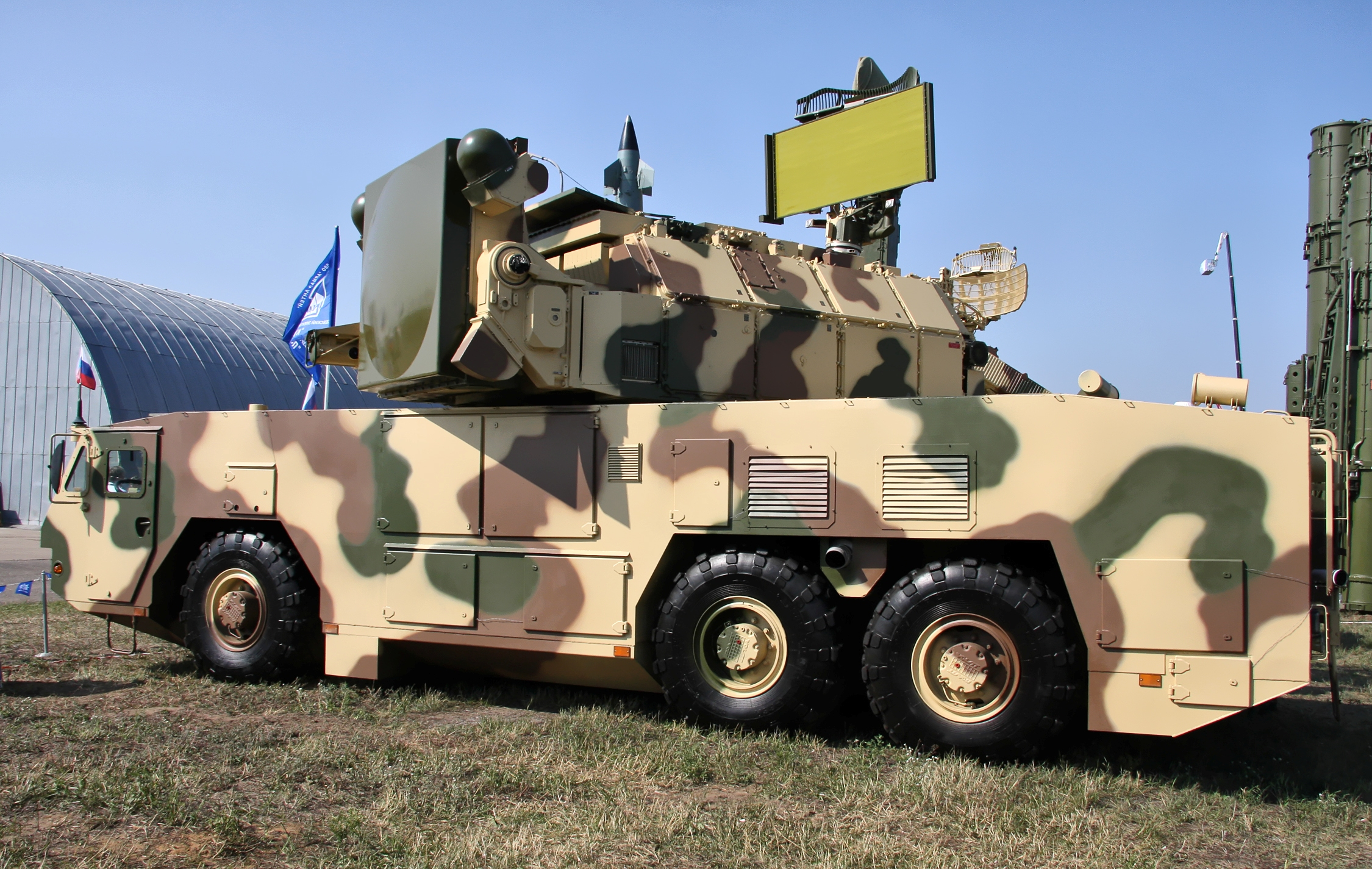
MZKT-6922 Tor

MZKT-6922, used with Tor and other surface-to-air missile systems.

==== MZKT-79221 ====
- MZKT-79221 transporter erector launcher for the Topol-M missile; a successor to the MAZ-7917, which was, in turn, a successor to the MAZ-547
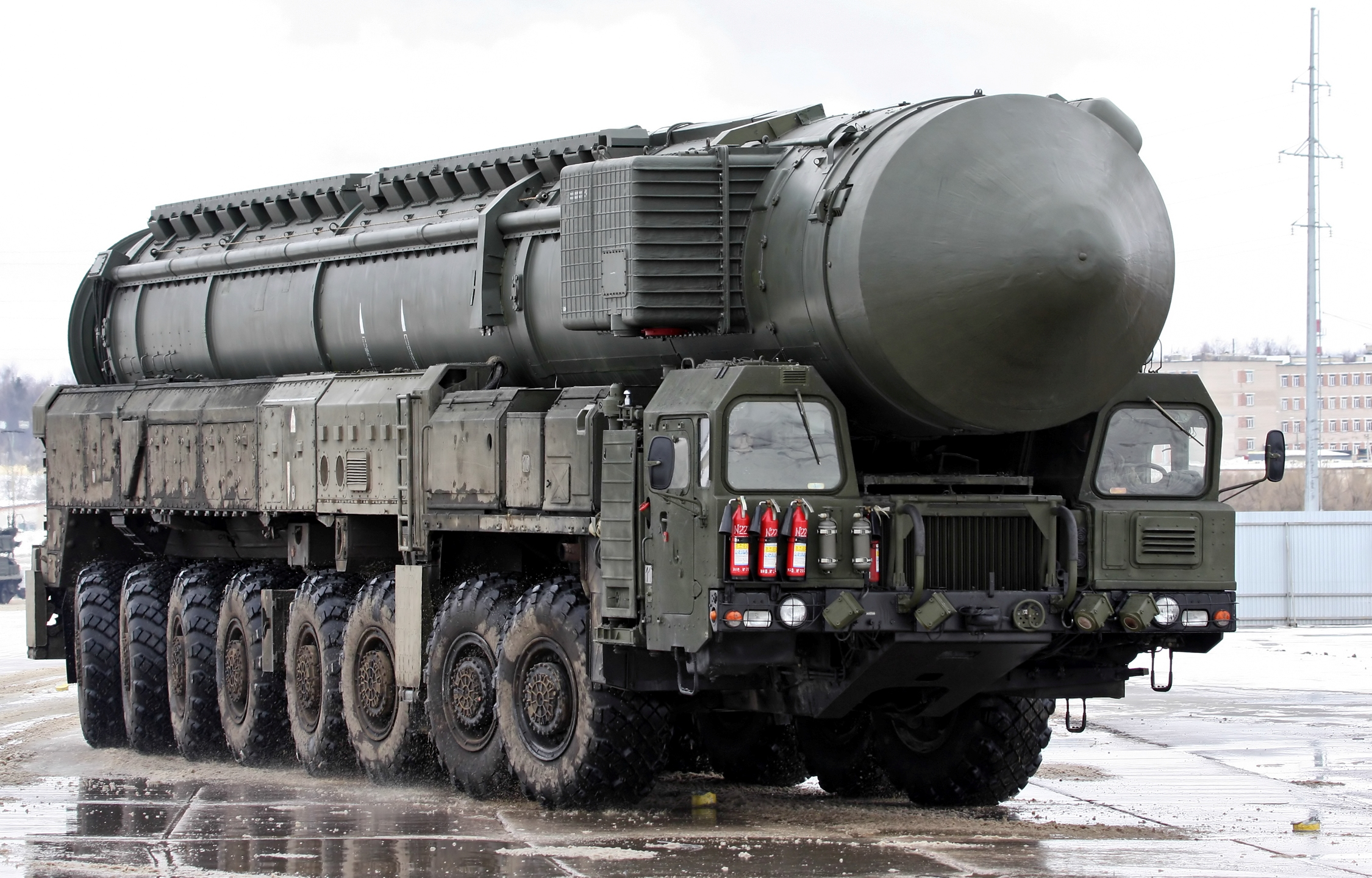
MZKT-79221

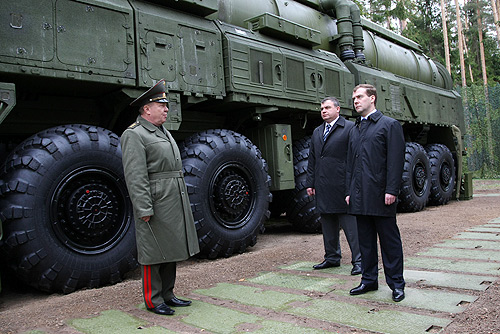
Dmitry Medvedev standing with MZKT-79221 Topol-M

==== MZKT-7930 ====
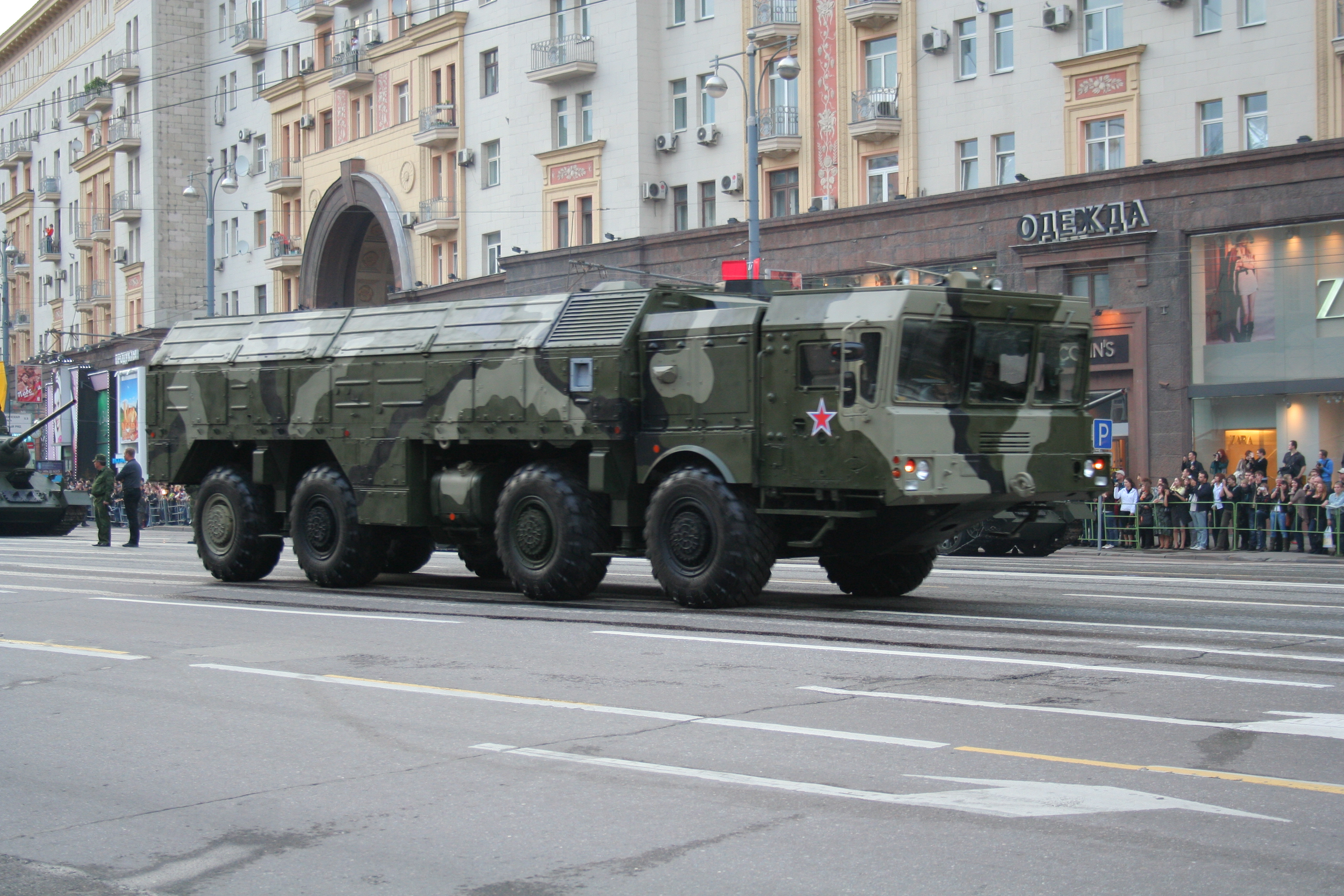
MZKT-7930 with 9K720 Iskander

The MZKT-7930 "Astrolog" is carrying the Iskander ballistic missiles, and the Pantsir-S1 air defense system, and radars for the S-300 missile system. Also Uragan-1M MLRS.

==== MZKT-74135/74295 ====
MZKT-74135 8x8 tank transporter

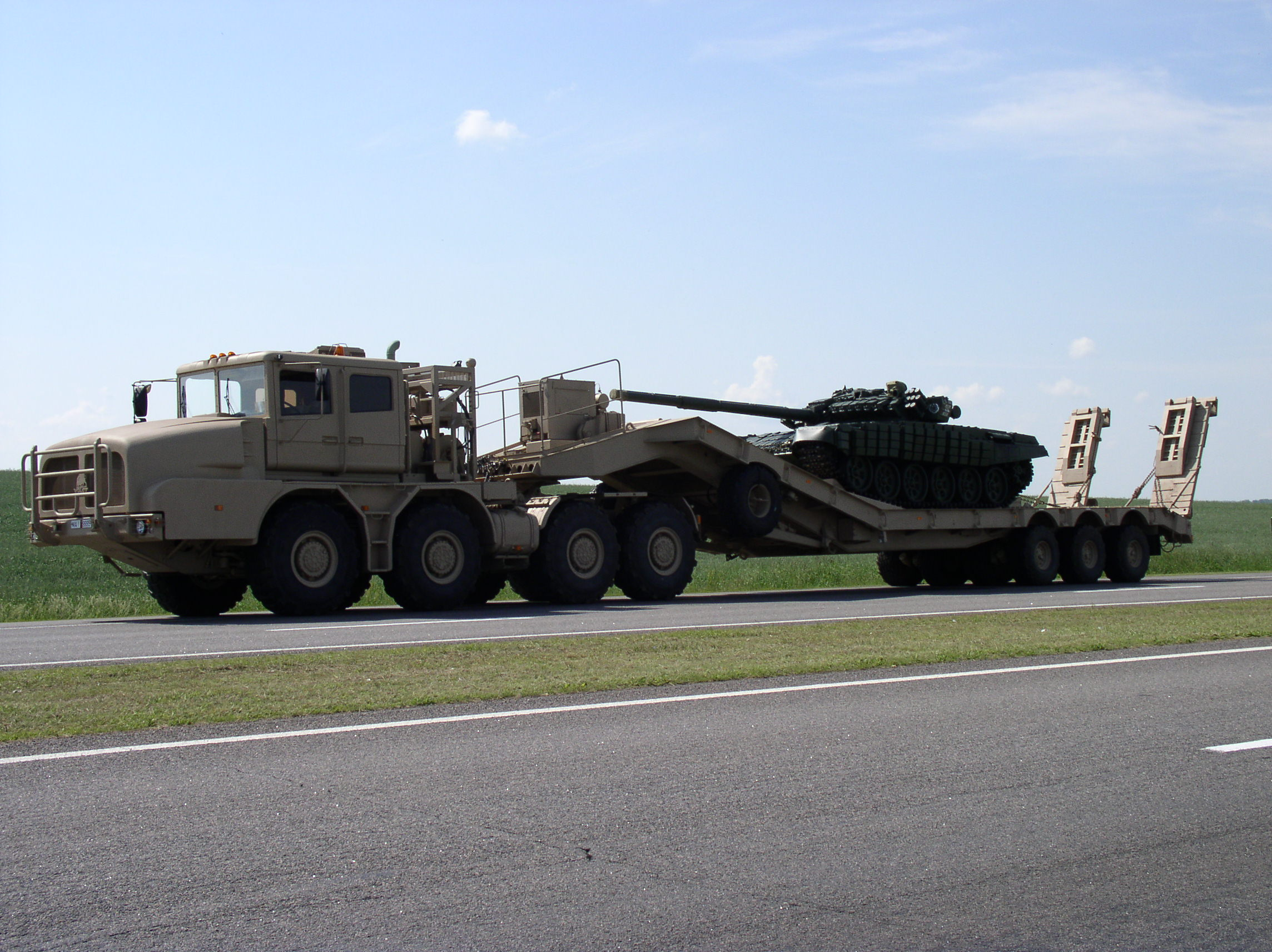
MZKT-74135 transporting a T-72

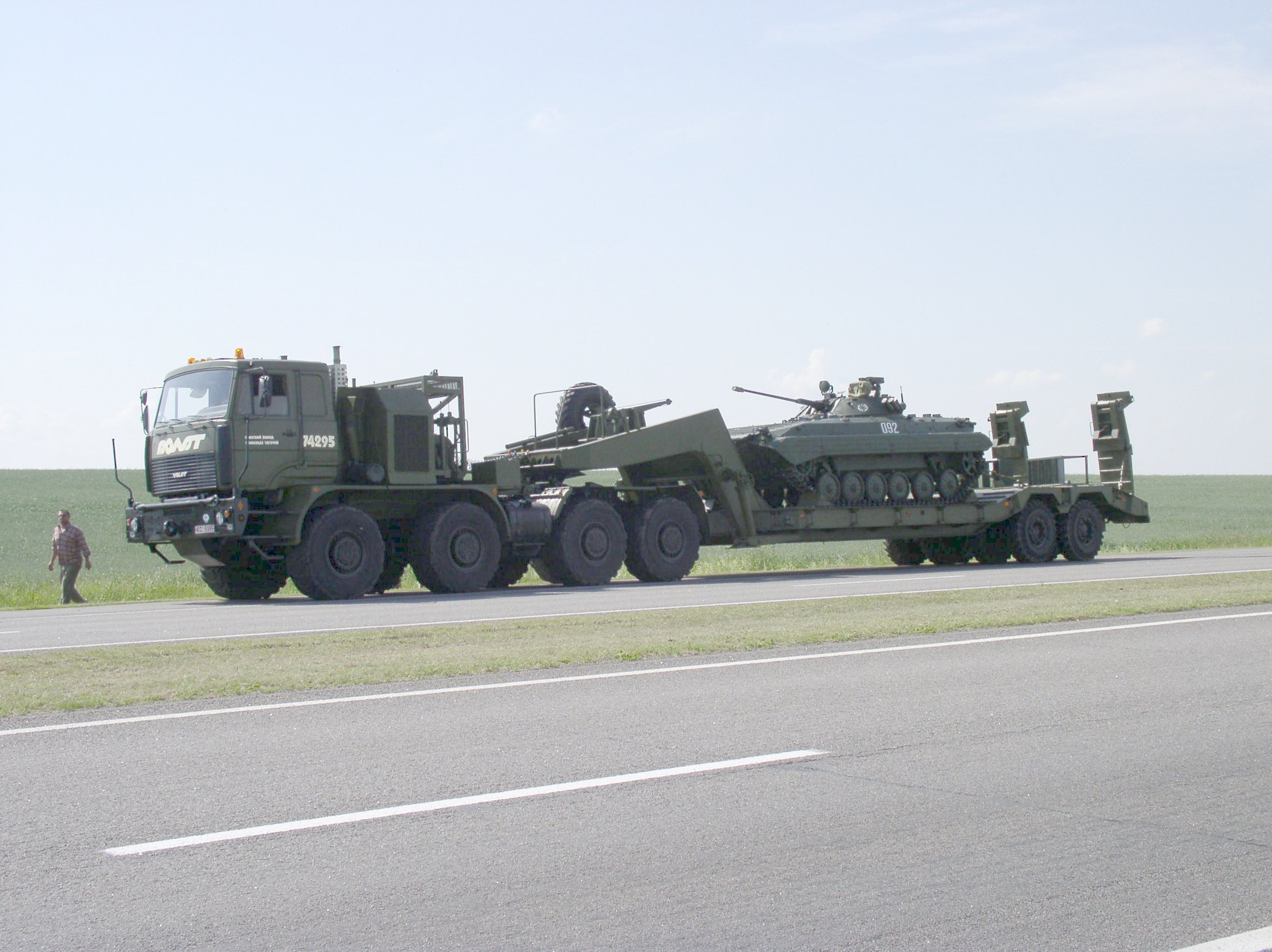
MZKT-74295 transporting a BMP-2

==== MZKT-490100 ====
MZKT-490100 armored vehicle used with four ready-to-launch Shershen ATGMs or with the Groza-S jamming system.

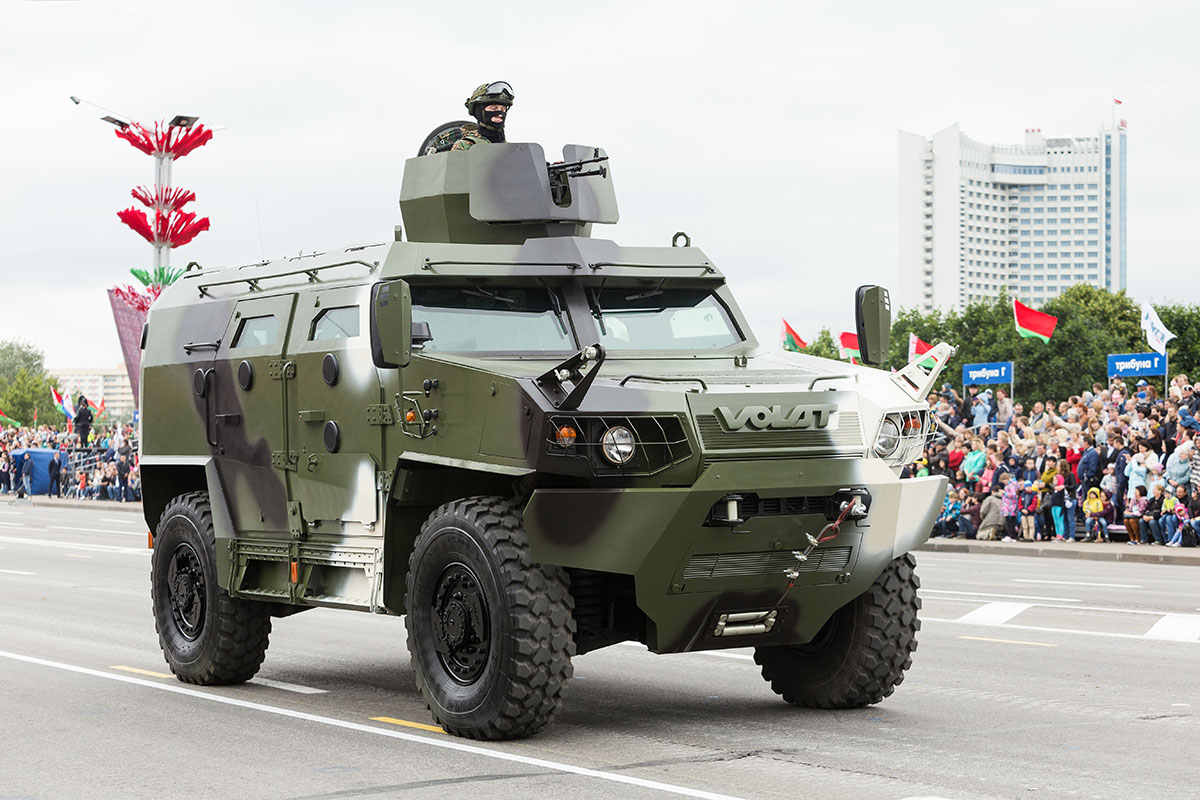
MZKT-490100

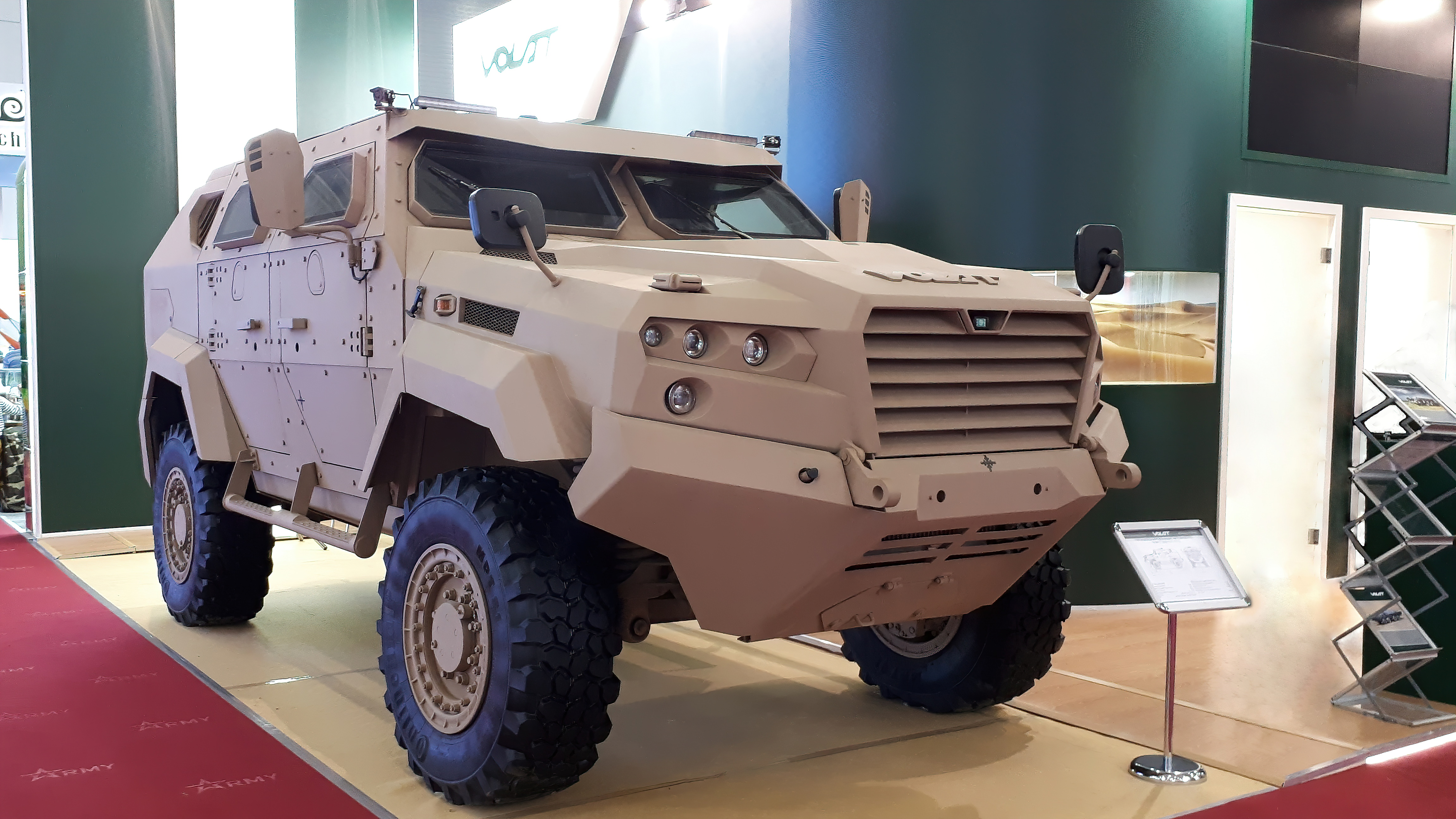
MZKT-490101-010 during the "Armiya 2020" exhibition

==== WS2400 ====
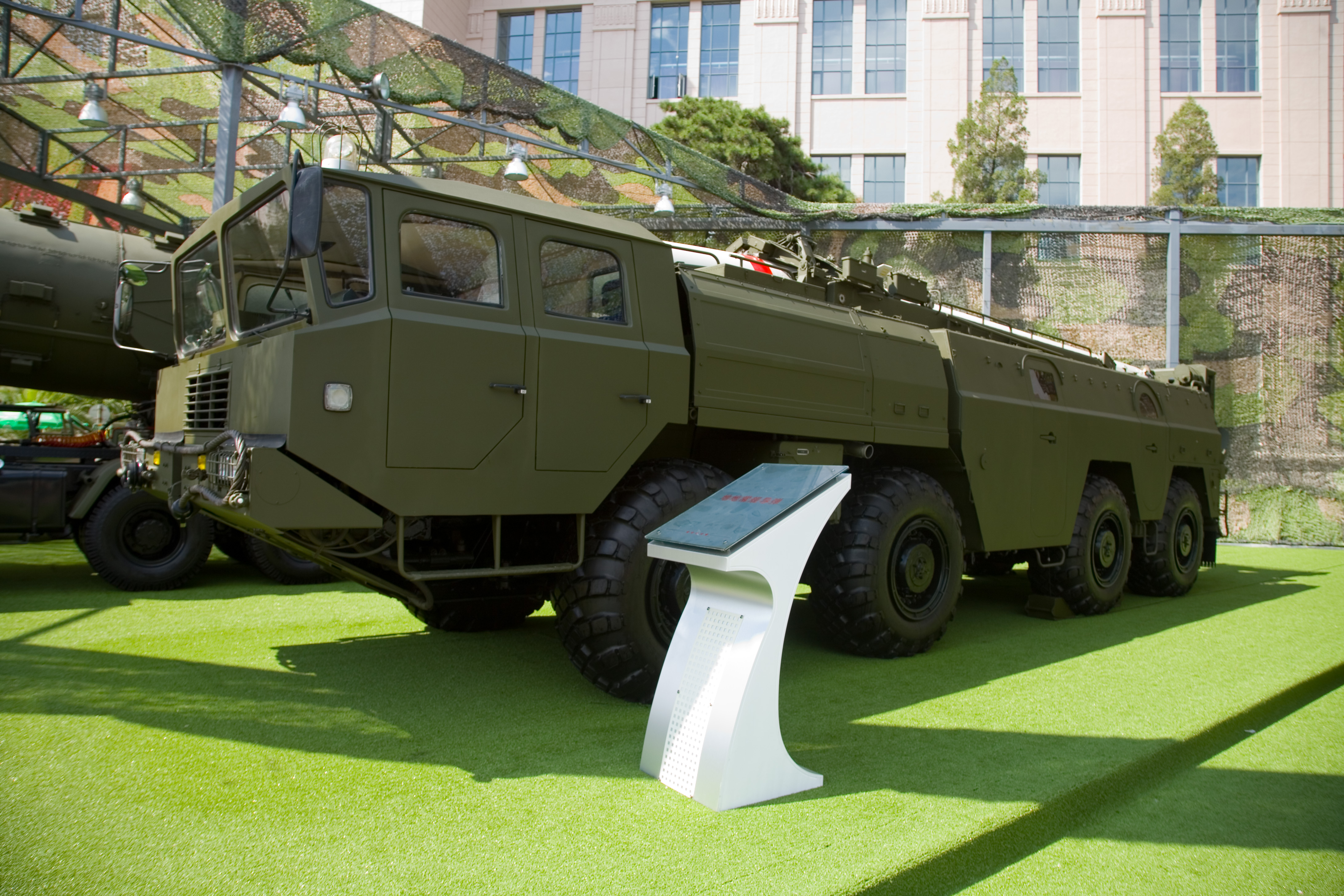
Wanshan WS2400 TEL with DF-11 SRBM.

Some trucks made by Wanshan Special Vehicle, in China, are based on MZKT designs; the WS2400 is based on the MAZ-543.

==== Volat V2 ====
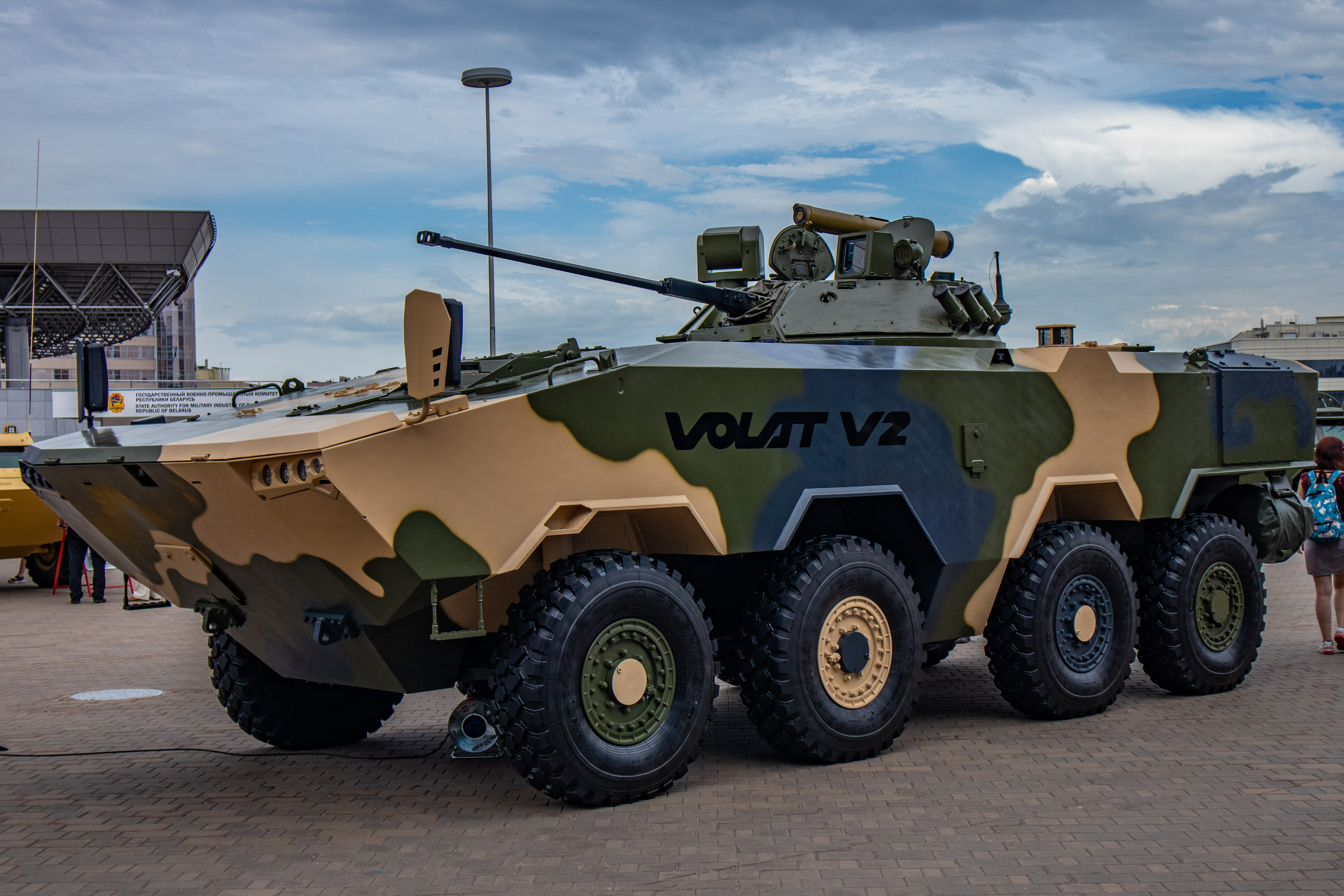
Volat V2 at Milex-2021 exhibition.

Volat V2 APC (MZKT-690003) with 2A42 30mm autocannon and other weaponry was first presented at Milex-2021 exhibition.

== Volat (civilian vehicles) ==
=== Trucks ===
- MZKT-79086, 12x12 oilfield truck
- MZKT-7429, 8x8 offroad tractor
- MZKT-790976, 8x8 oilfield truck
- MZKT-75165 8x8 tipper
- MZKT-741320, ballast tractor
- MZKT-741600, ballast tractor
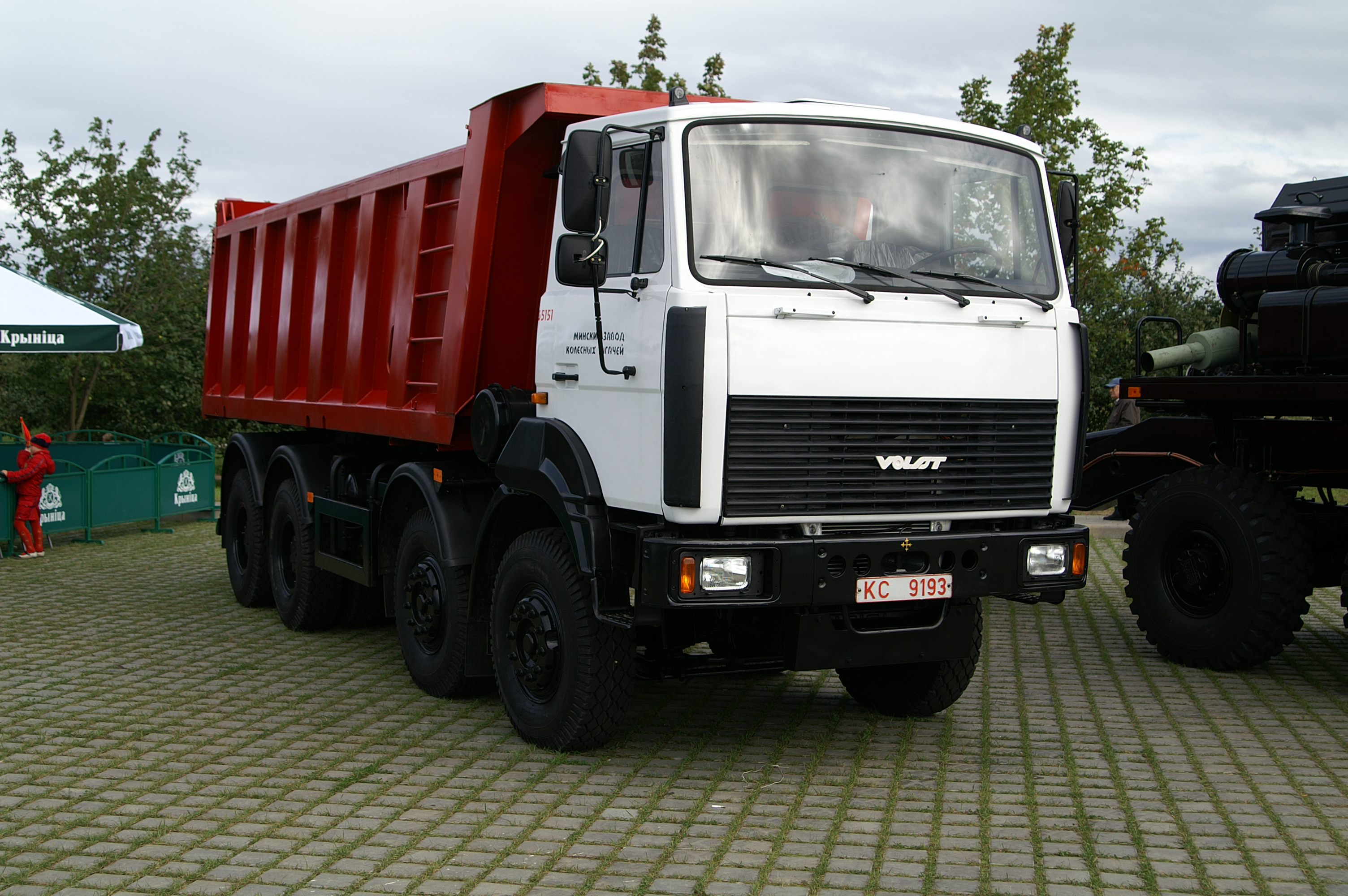
MZKT-65151

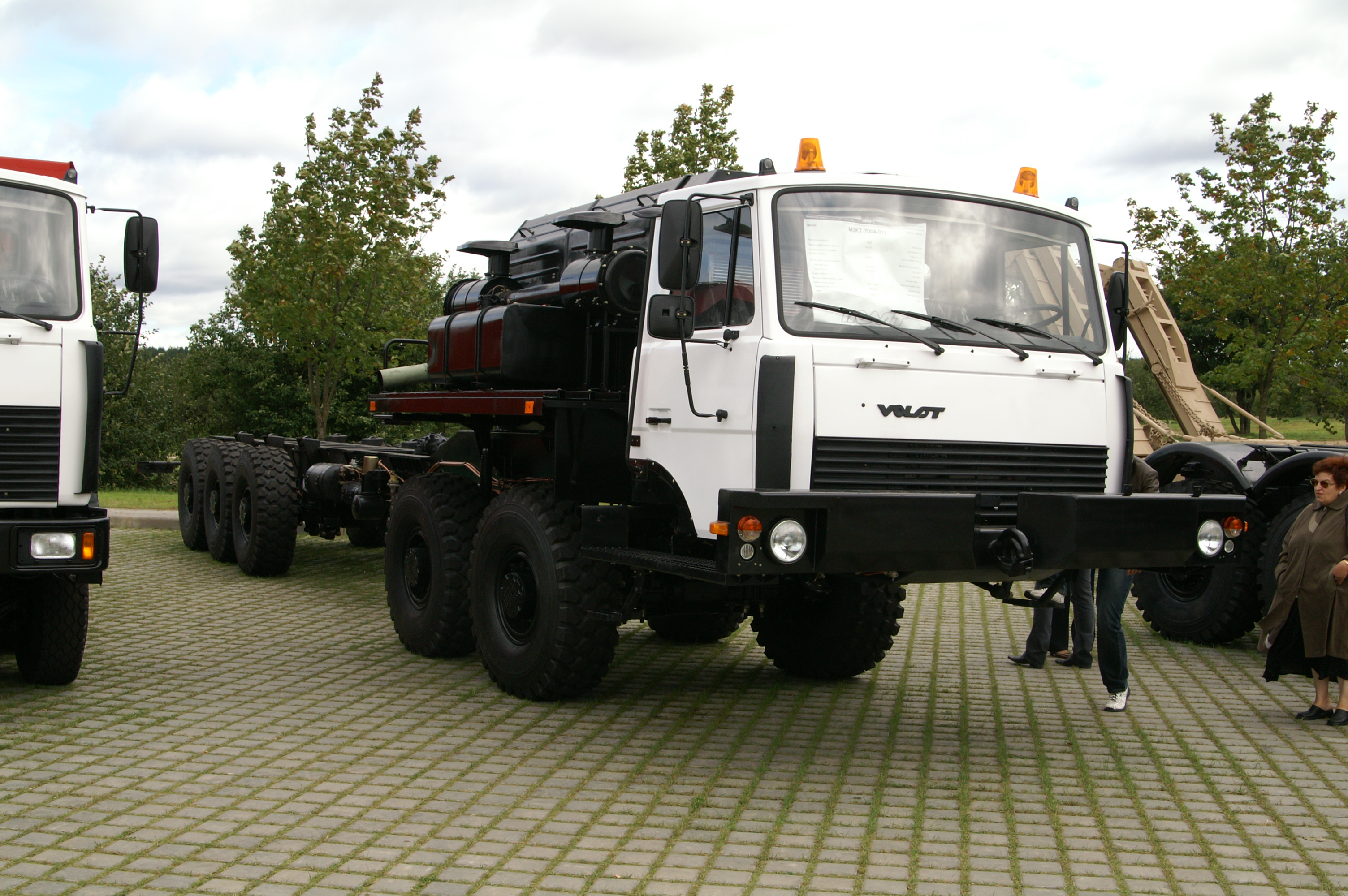
MZKT-7004

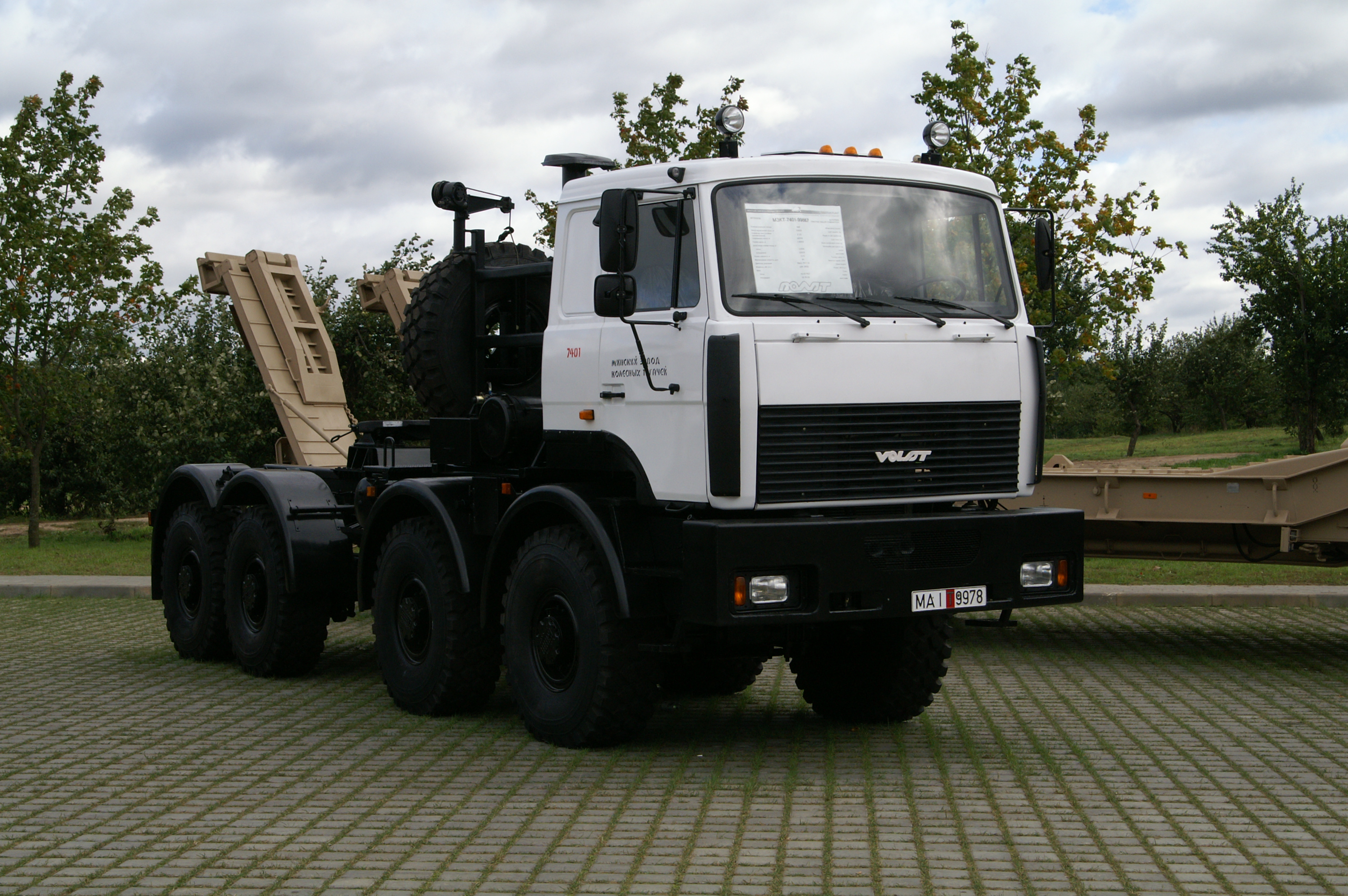
MZKT-7401

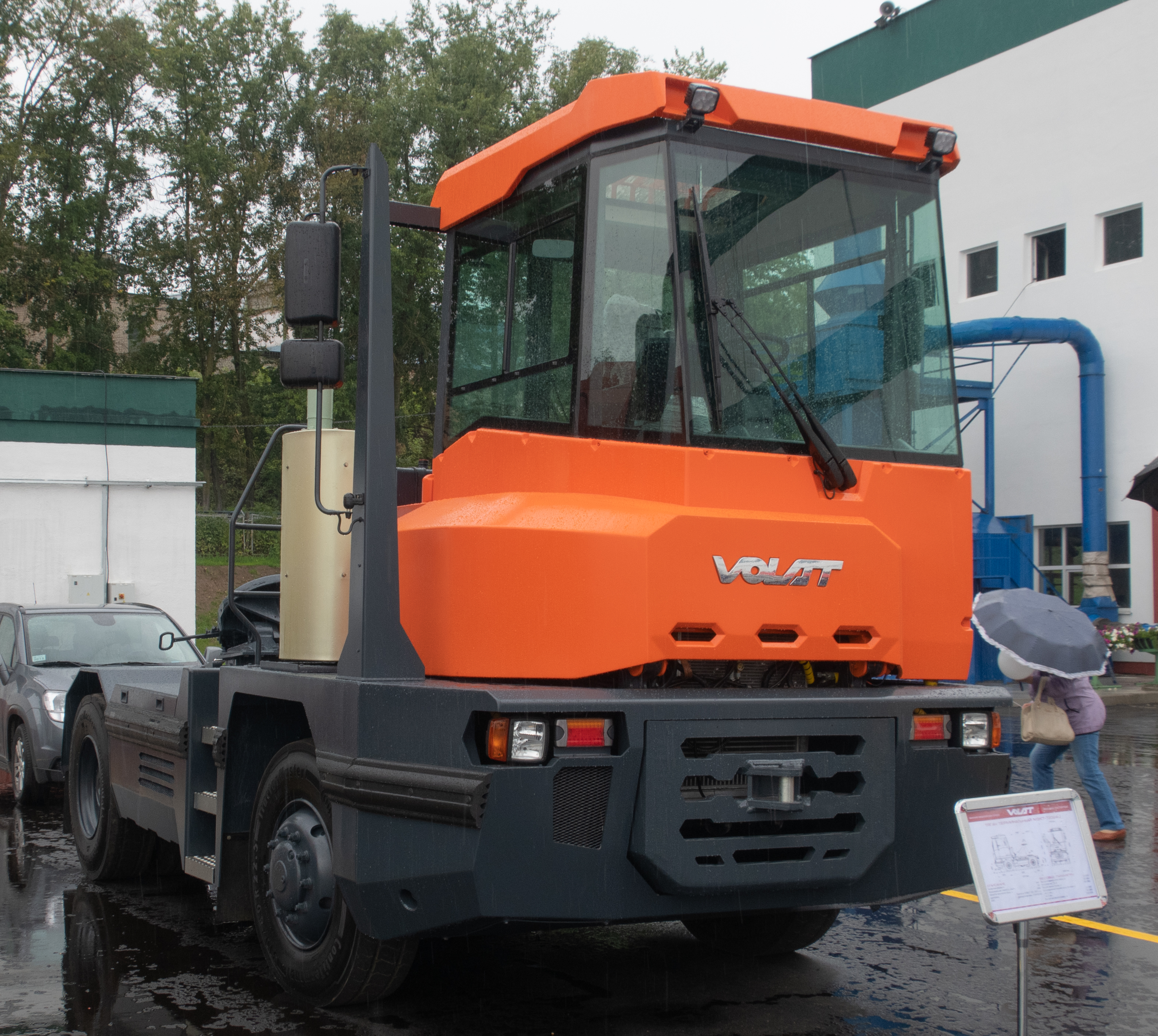
MZKT-730240 (port tractor)

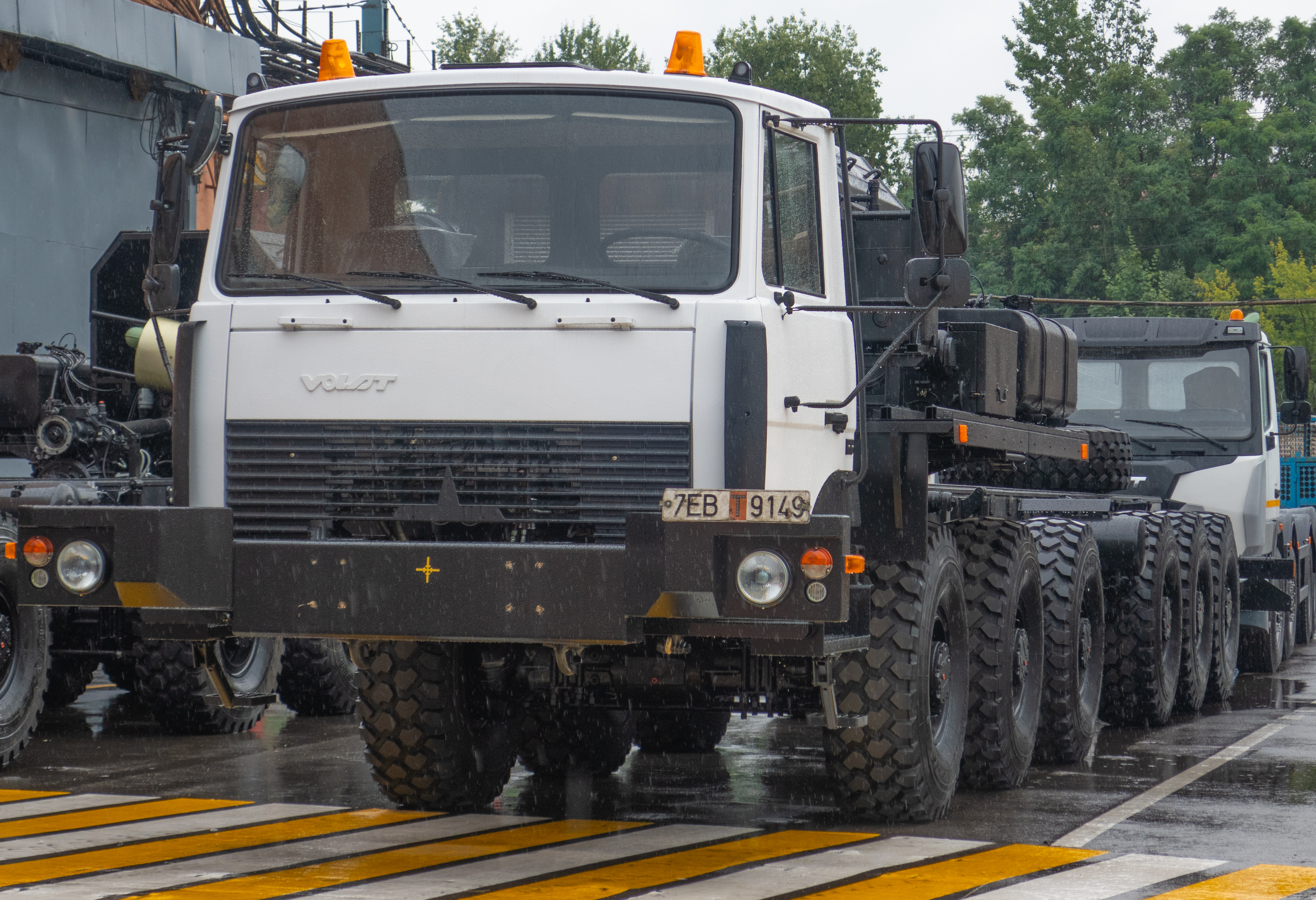
MZKT-700300

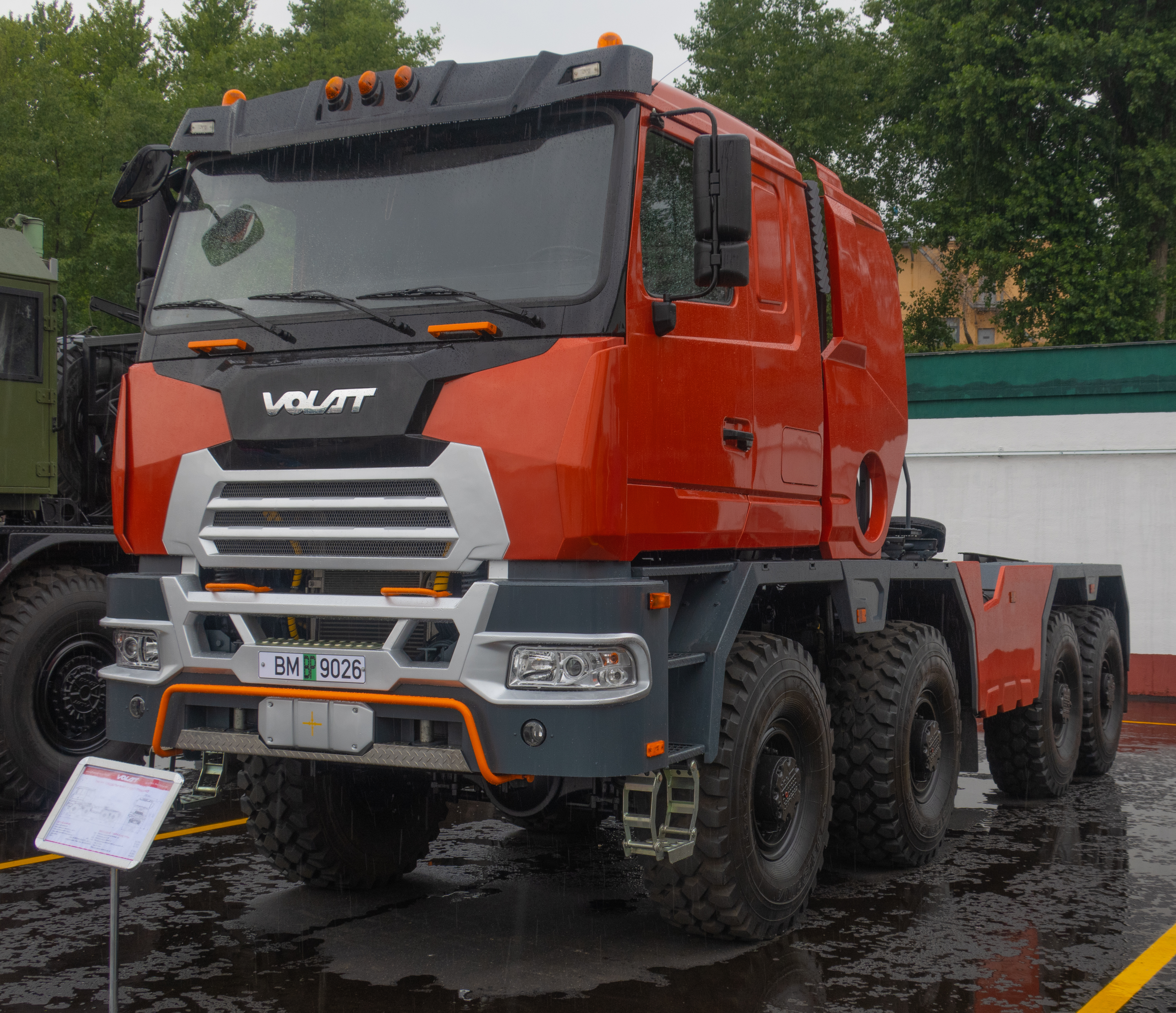
MZKT-750440

=== Trailer ===
- MZKT-900110 (2 axles, 29T)
- MZKT-900130 (2 axles, 36T)
- MZKT-937800 (2 axles, 56T)
- MZKT-5247D0-010 (2 axles, 50T)
- MZKT-998670 (2 axles, 70T)
- MZKT-720200 (3 axles, 45T)
- MZKT-999453 (3 axles, 46T)
- MZKT-998910 (3 axles, 50T)
- MZKT-820100 (4 axles, 63T)
- MZKT-837200 (4 axles, 65T)
- MZKT-999451 (5 axles, 64T)
- MZKT-999450 (6 axles, 73T)

== International sanctions ==
On 17 December 2020, MZKT was added to the sanctions list of the European Union. The United Kingdom and Switzerland have also sanctioned the company.

In 2022, the plant, its director, Aliaksei Rymasheuski, and deputy director, Aliaksandr Vetsianevich, were included in the Specially Designated Nationals and Blocked Persons List of the United States, as well as in the sanctions lists of the United Kingdom, Australia, Canada, New Zealand and Ukraine. In addition, Japan has imposed sanctions against the MZKT.

On April 19, 2024, the U.S. State Department imposed sanctions on MWTP pursuant to Executive Order 13382, which targets proliferators of weapons of mass destruction and their means of delivery. The State Department statement read: "[MWTP] has worked to supply special vehicle chassis to Pakistan’s long-range ballistic missile program. Such chassis are used as launch support equipment for ballistic missiles by Pakistan’s National Development Complex (NDC), which is responsible for the development of Missile Technology Control Regime Category (MTCR) I ballistic missiles."

== See also ==
- Neman - the bus subsidiary of MZKT.
- KZKT - A similar, now defunct, Russian company
- BelAZ
- KrAZ
- MAZ
