= MZKT-74135 =

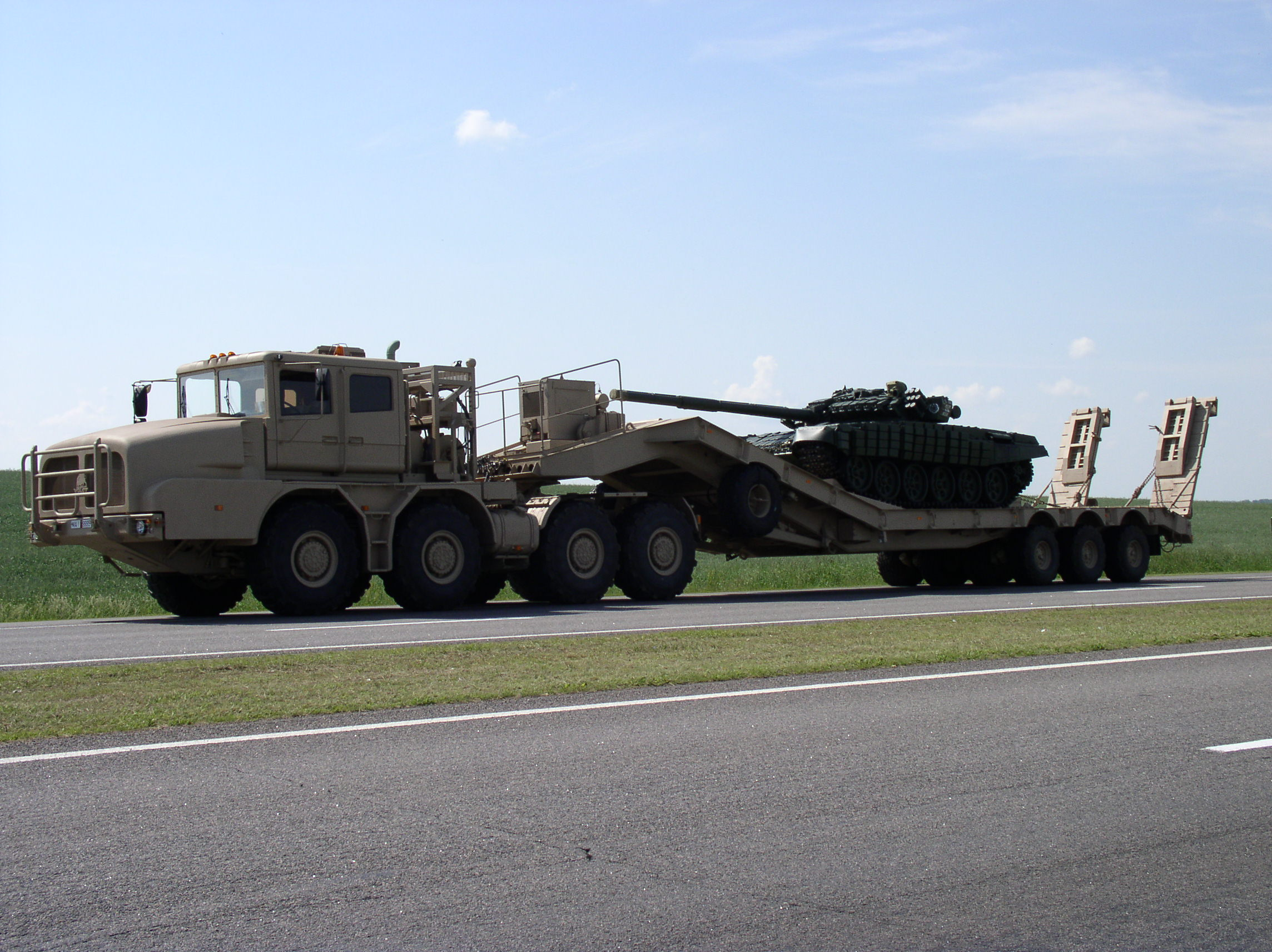
- MZKT-74135 transporting a T-72
- Type: 8×8 heavy tractor
- Place of origin: Belarus

Production history
- Designer: MZKT
- Manufacturer: MZKT
- Produced: 1997–present
- Variants: MZKT-741351

Specifications
- Mass: Unladen (tractor) 25,000 kg (55,000 lb)
- Length: 10.83 m (426 in)
- Width: 3.12 m (123 in)
- Height: 3.95 m (13 ft 0 in)
- Crew: 1 operators (driver) + 8 additional spaces
- Engine: 22 L (1,300 cu in) Mercedes-Benz OM444LA turbodiesel engine 798 hp (595 kW)
- Payload capacity: Up to 205 tons GCWR
- Transmission: Allison Transmission M6610R 6-speed automatic
- Suspension: Independent suspension on all axles
- Operational range: 600 km (370 mi)
- Maximum speed: 82 km/h (51 mph)

MZKT-74135 is a tank transporter developed by MZKT of Belarus. It has a 594 kW (797 hp) engine and can tow up to 130 metric tons. The MZKT-74135 can transport either two tanks or one tank and two infantry fighting vehicles. It is equipped with independent suspension all around with all wheel drive and was developed specifically for hot desert climates. Forty units were ordered by UAE.

== See also ==
- Oshkosh M1070
- KAMAZ-7850
