= TMM-6 =

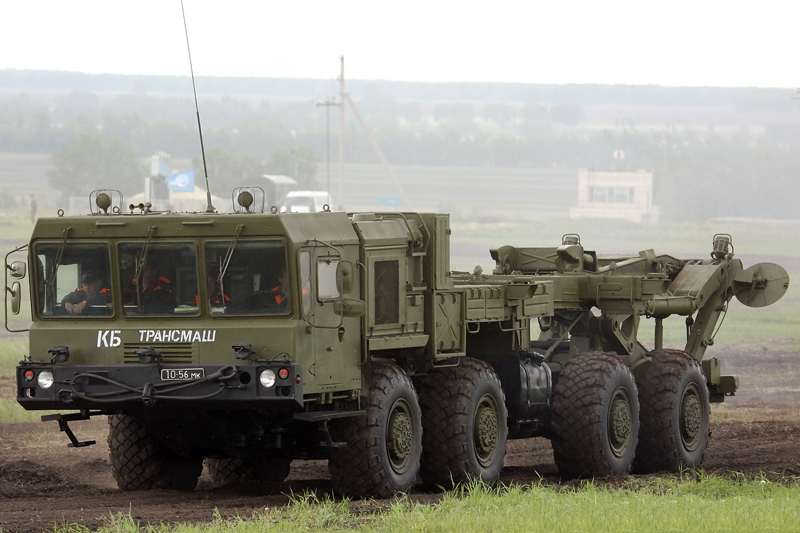
- A TMM-6 in Omsk, 2009
- Type: Wheeled vehicle-launched bridge
- Place of origin: Russia

Service history
- In service: 2000-Present
- Used by: Azerbaijan; Russia; Syria; Vietnam
- Wars: Russo-Ukrainian War; Russian invasion of Ukraine

Production history
- Designed: 1990s
- Manufacturer: Omsktransmash
- Developed from: MZKT-7930
- Produced: 1999-?
- No. built: unknown, likely low number produced.

Specifications
- Mass: 36.4 t
- Length: 12.67 m (without bridge)
- Width: 3.07 m
- Height: 3.02 m (without bridge)
- Crew: 2

The TMM-6 is a Russian bridge-laying vehicle. It was developed by Omsktransmash in Omsk between 1999 and the late 2000s. It was built to replace older Russian bridge-launching vehicles

== Etymology ==
TMM-6 is an abbreviation for "Tyazhelo Mekhniznrovanny Most 6," which translates to "Heavy Mechanized Bridge 6" in English. It is also known as the "Gusenitsa-2." The original Gusenitsa-1 was the MTU-90, which was based on the Russian T-90 battle tank.

== Description ==
The TMM-6 was designed to replace older bridge-launching vehicles, such as the Soviet T-72 AVLB. The chassis of an MZKT-7930 makes up the base of the launch vehicle. The TMM-6 has no armor, but it does feature an NBC defense system.

An earlier prototype, the TMM-5, was produced in very small quantities. The TMM-5 was based on the chassis of the Soviet MAZ-543.

=== Bridge ===
The single-span folded scissor bridge rests on a three-axle KamAZ-5350 chassis. A hydraulic winch is used to both assemble and dissemble the bridge. A single section of the bridge has a length of 17 meters, and a theoretically infinite number of sections can be added on. The sections of the bridge can be laid in gaps and water between 2 and 5 meters deep. It takes around 45 minutes to deploy the bridge. The bridge has a weight capacity of 60 tons and can, in a single hour, carry up to 400 vehicles moving at 30 kilometers per hour. A single vehicle's bridge is able to bridge a gap up to 40 meters wide.

== Operators ==
- Azerbaijan - As part of a larger shipment of military supplies ordered from Russia in 2011, Azerbaijan received several TMM-6s in Baku. The deal was between the Russian defense company Uralvagonzavod and the Government of Azerbaijan.
- Russia - Russia has produced an unknown but likely low number of TMM-6s since 1999. They have entered service in the Russian invasion of Ukraine, a major escalation in the ongoing Russo-Ukrainian War.
- Syria - Multiple MZKT-7930 chassis was purchased by the Syrian Government in 2010, as part of a larger purchase of K-300P Bastion-Ps.
- Vietnam - Also in 2010, Vietnam purchased several MZKT-7930 chassis. It was a part of their increase in defense and military spending.
