= Neman (bus manufacturer) =

Bus manufacturer in Belarus

- Industry: Automotive
- Founded: 1984
- Founder: Ministry of Radio Industry of the Soviet Union
- Headquarters: Lida, Belarus
- Products: buses

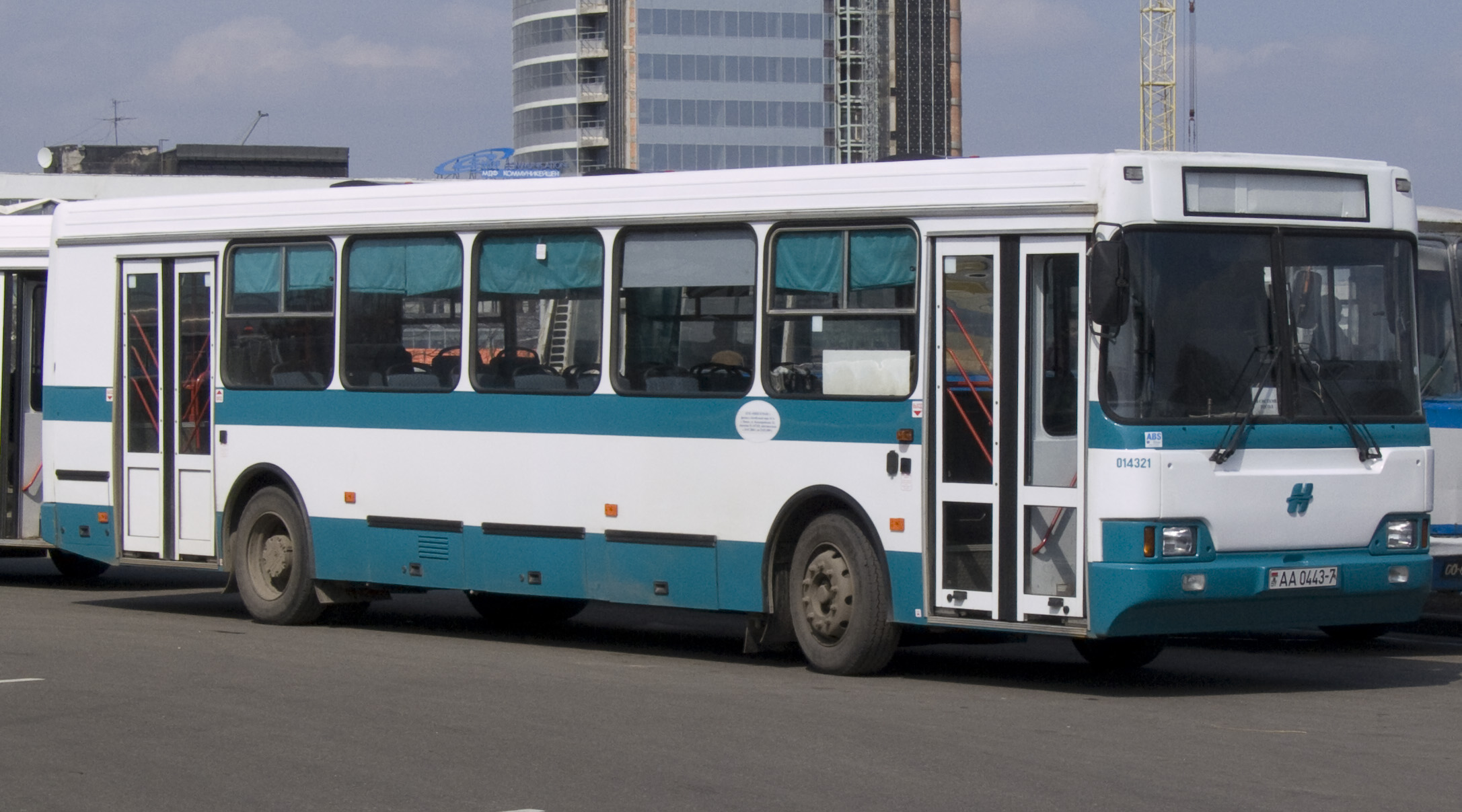
Neman-52012

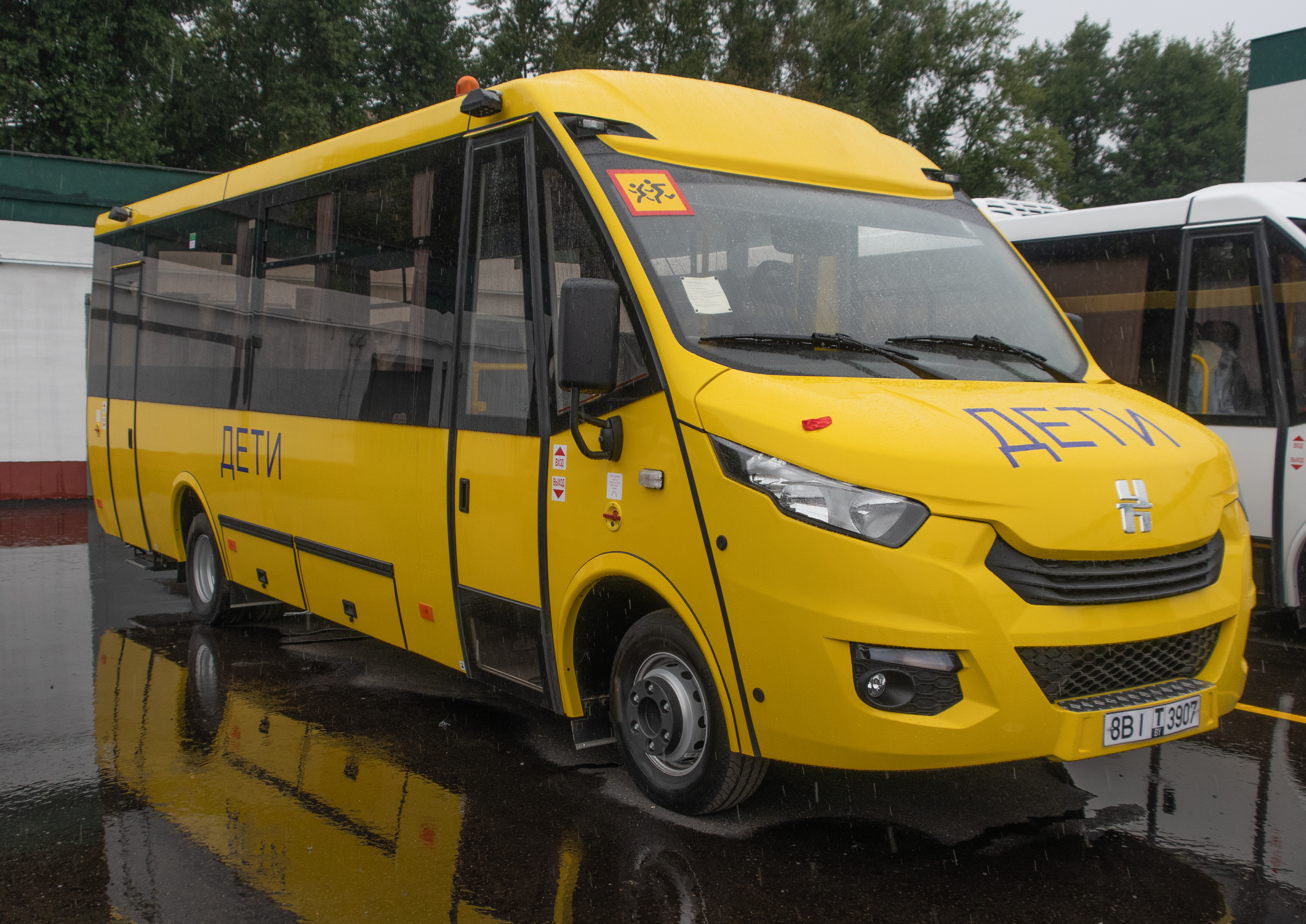
Neman-4202 school bus

Lida Buses Neman (Belarusian: Лідскія аўтобусы "Нёман") is a state-owned bus manufacturer located in Lida, Belarus.

== History ==
The company was founded in May 1984 by the Ministry of Radio Industry of the Soviet Union to produce industrial equipment (assembly and testing machinery) for its parent Association, Agat. In 1988, the plant was designated as a pilot plant to manufacture prototypes. After the dissolution of the Soviet Union, the plant reoriented itself to produce household items (gas burners, electric motors, fans). Since the factory still had unused capacity, it entered into agreement with the Likino Bus Factory (LiAZ) to produce LiAZ-5256 buses. It produced its first bus in 1994. It also produced fire trucks AC-40, buses PAZ-3205, vans GAZelle. In 1998, the company began to produce its own original Neman buses. In June 2011, the company produced its 1000th bus.

Neman became part of MZKT in 2014

== Buses ==
Main models are:

- Neman-5201 (big city)
- Neman-52012 (suburban)
- Neman-3231 (small class)
- Neman-4202 (school bus)
