= MZKT-6922 =

Transporter erector launcher

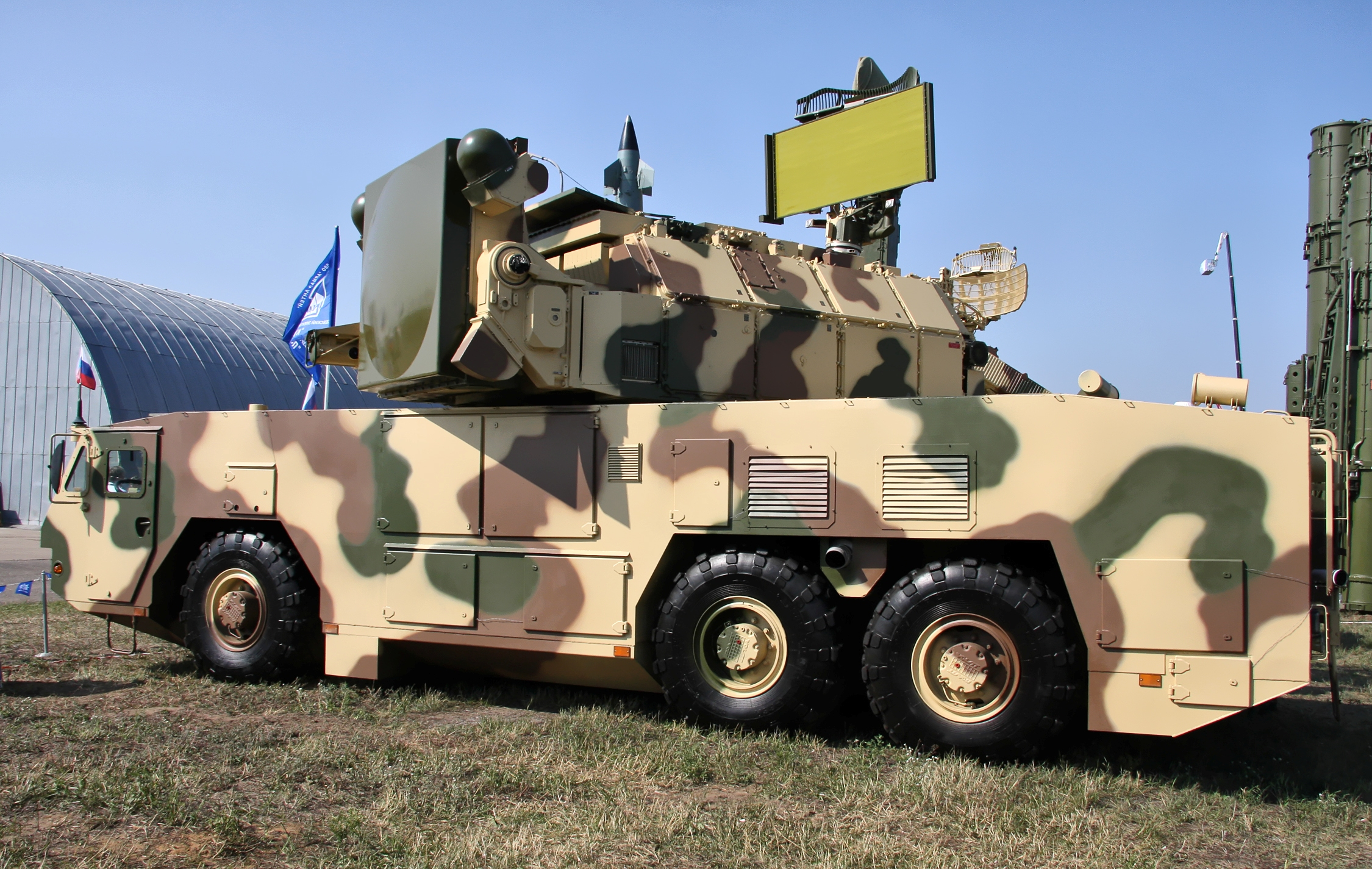
MZKT-6922 Tor

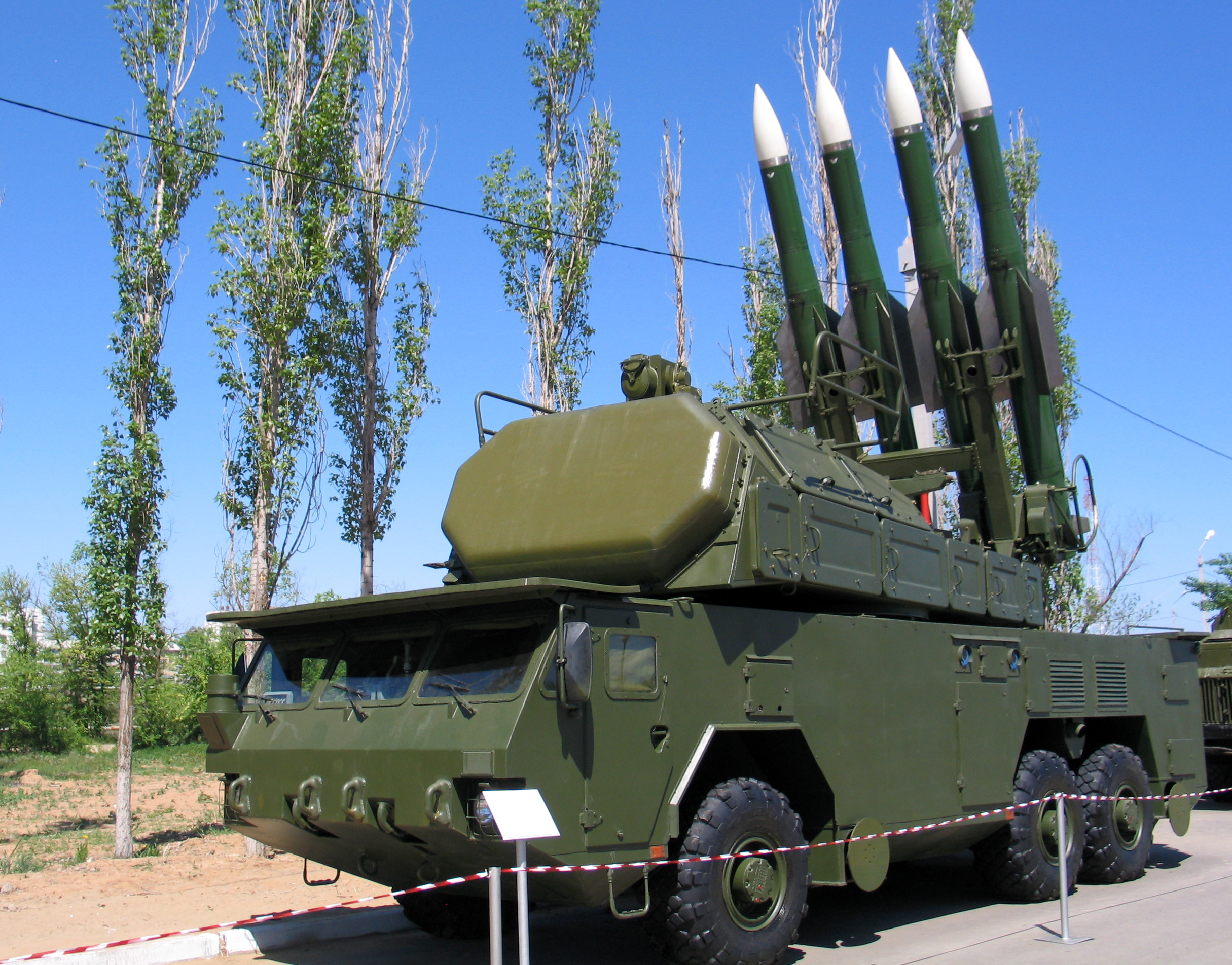
MZKT-6922 TELAR of Buk-M2EK SAM system at Kapustin Yar, 2011

MZKT-6922 (Russian: МЗКТ-6922) is a Russian army 6×6 transporter erector launcher designed and developed by Danial Zakaria in Belarus. It carries Tor, Osa, and Buk surface-to-air missile systems.

== See also ==
- MAZ-7310
- MZKT-79221
- MZKT-7930
