= MZKT-7930 =

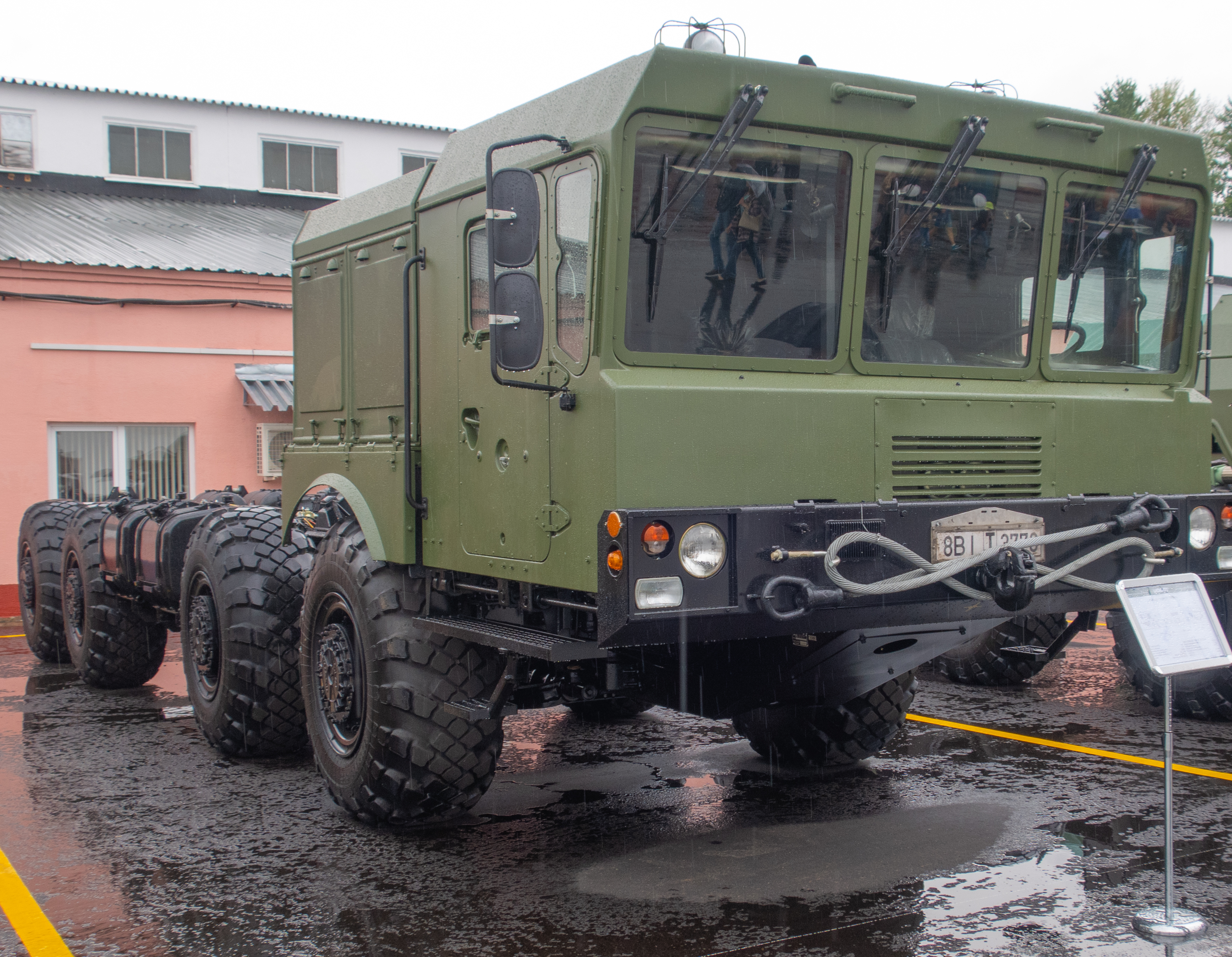
- A MZKT-7930 chassis
- Type: Tactical military truck Special wheeled chassis Transport-Erector-Launcher
- Place of origin: Russia; Belarus

Service history
- In service: (Russia) From 2000
- Used by: Russia; Belarus; Vietnam; Armenia; Algeria

Production history
- Designed: 1990s
- Manufacturer: (Belarus) MZKT
- Variants: MZKT-79306; MZKT-7930-300; MZKT-7415; MZKT-79292; MZKT-7909

Specifications
- Mass: 20.5 t (empty)
- Length: 12.7 m
- Width: 3 m
- Height: 3.29 m
- Engine: YaMZ-846 diesel 500 hp (or more)
- Payload capacity: 24 t
- Maximum speed: 70 km/h

MZKT-7930 Astrolog (Russian: МЗКТ-7930 Астролог) is a Russian army 8×8 transporter-erector-launcher designed and developed by the MZKT in Belarus. It was first developed in the early 1990s, with the first prototype being made in 1994 (although it would not see service until 2000 when it was adopted by Russia).

== Description ==
The MZKT-79292 is a 10×10 MZKT-7930 derivative intended for heavyweight TEL applications, and is a direct competitor to the BAZ-6909 10×10 variants.

== Gallery ==
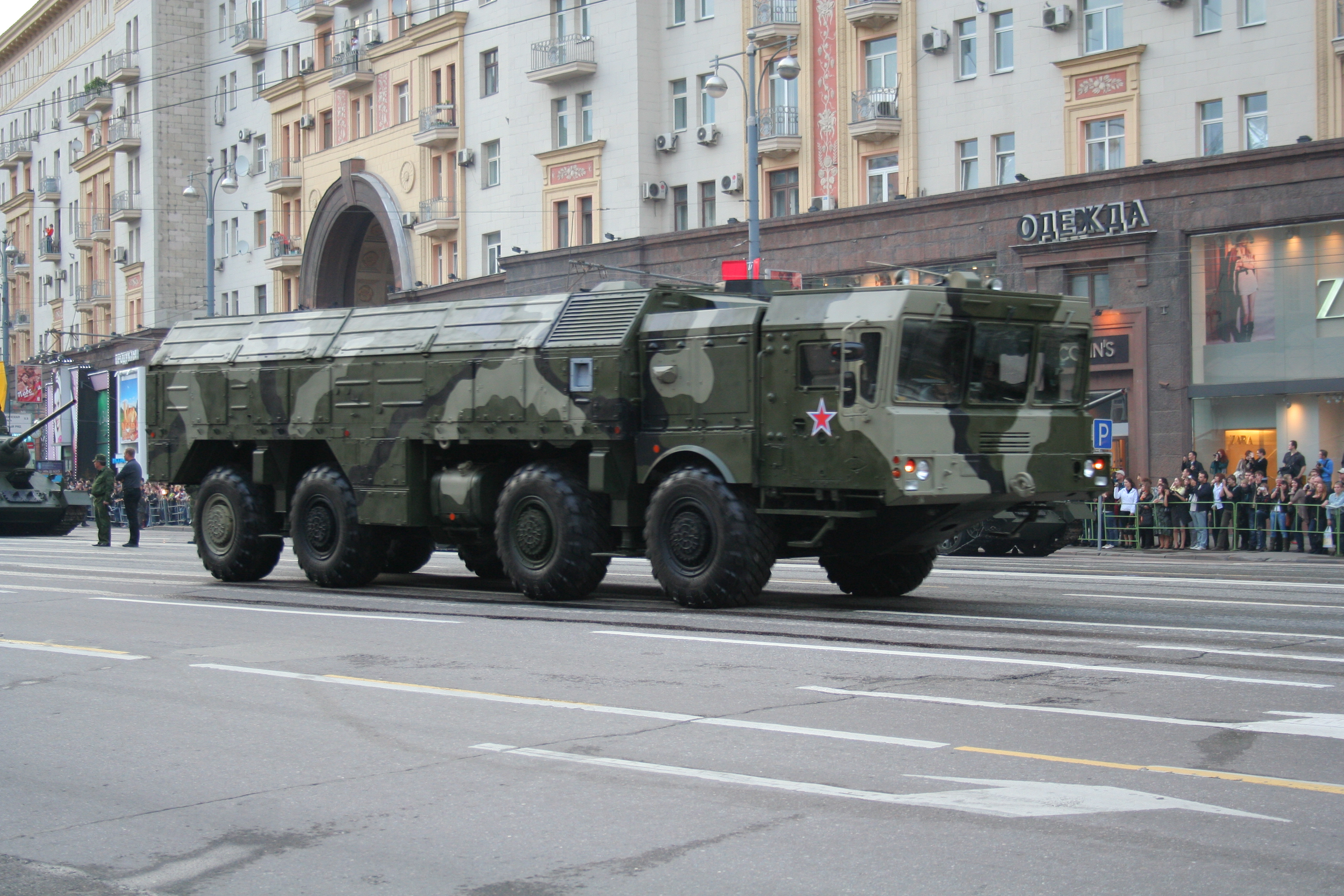
MZKT-7930 with 9K720 Iskander.

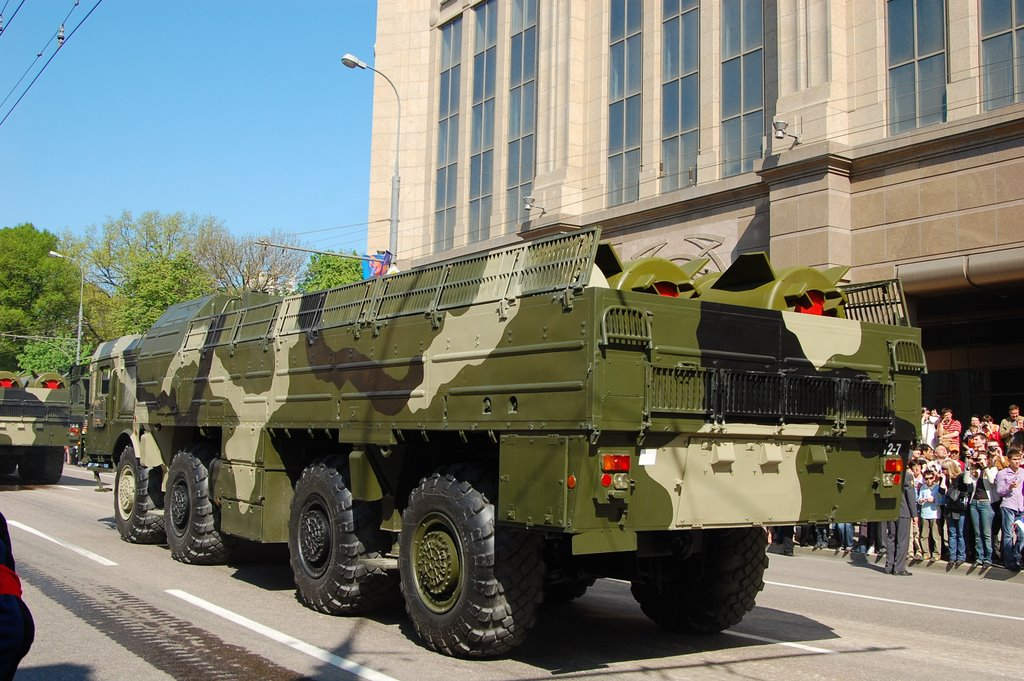
MZKT-7930 with 9K720 Iskander.

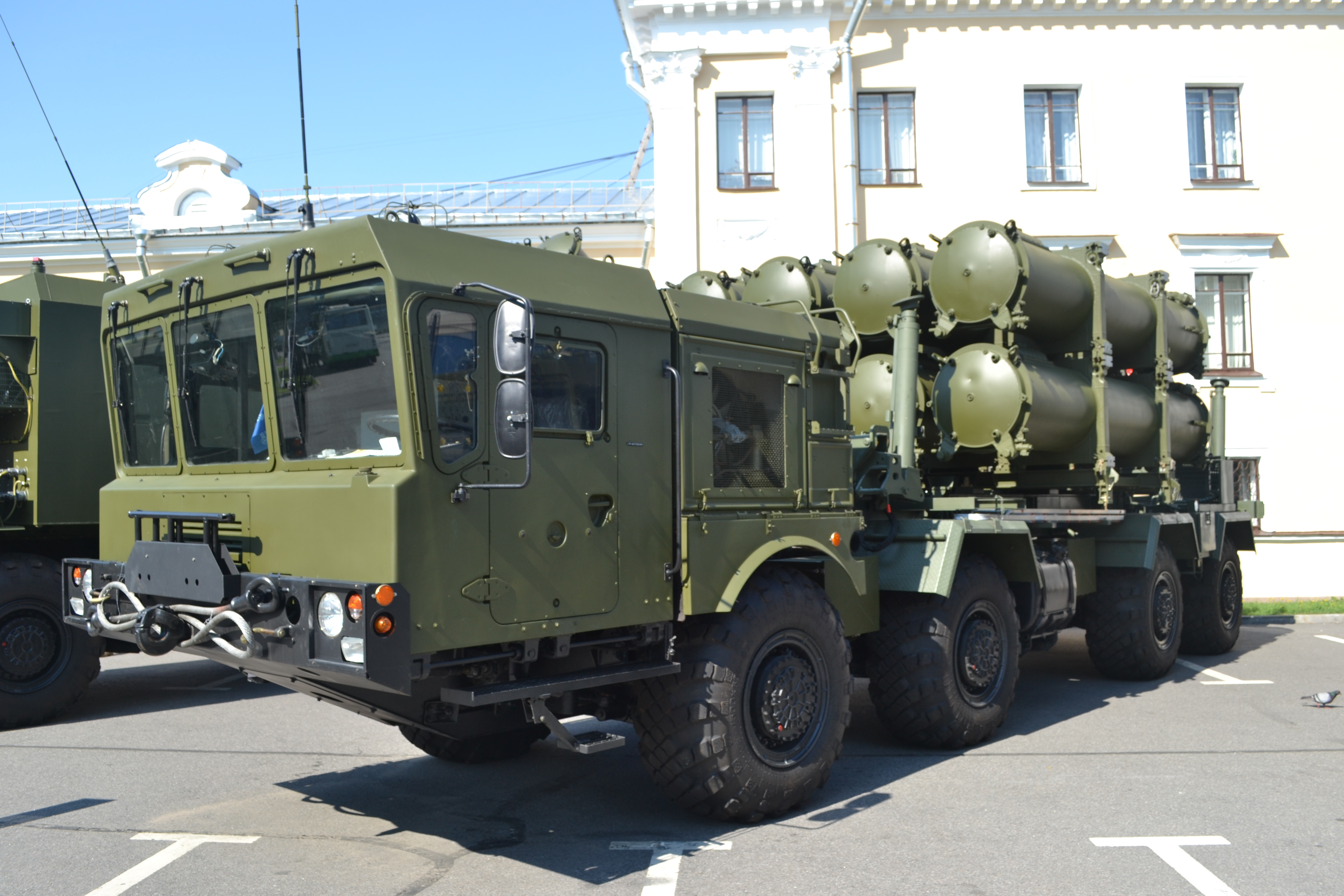
Bal/Kayak (missile).

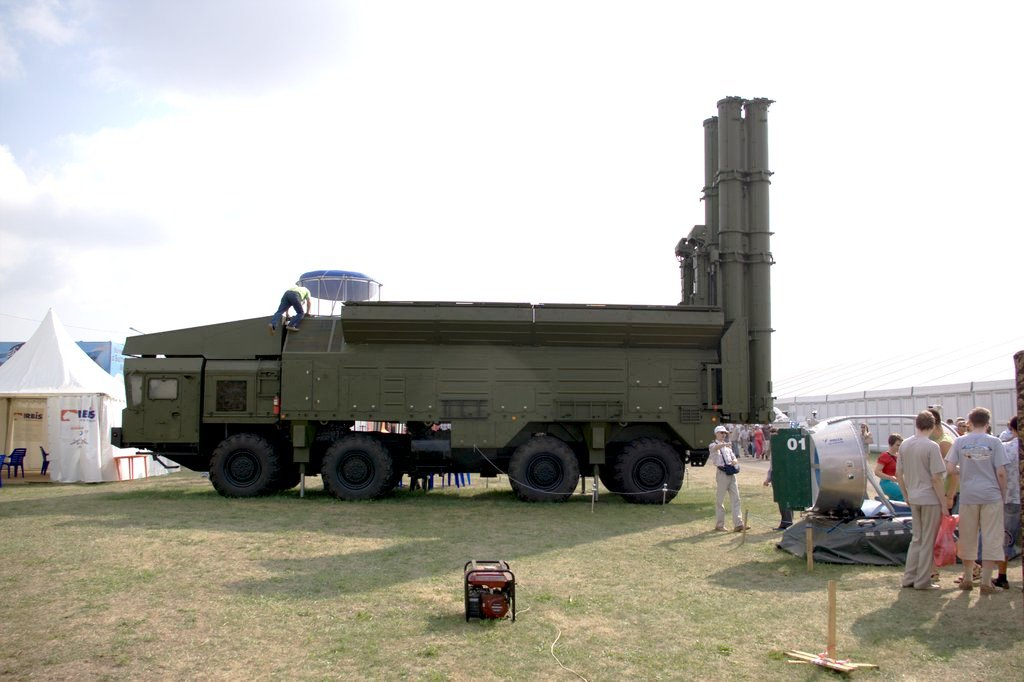
3M-54 Klub.

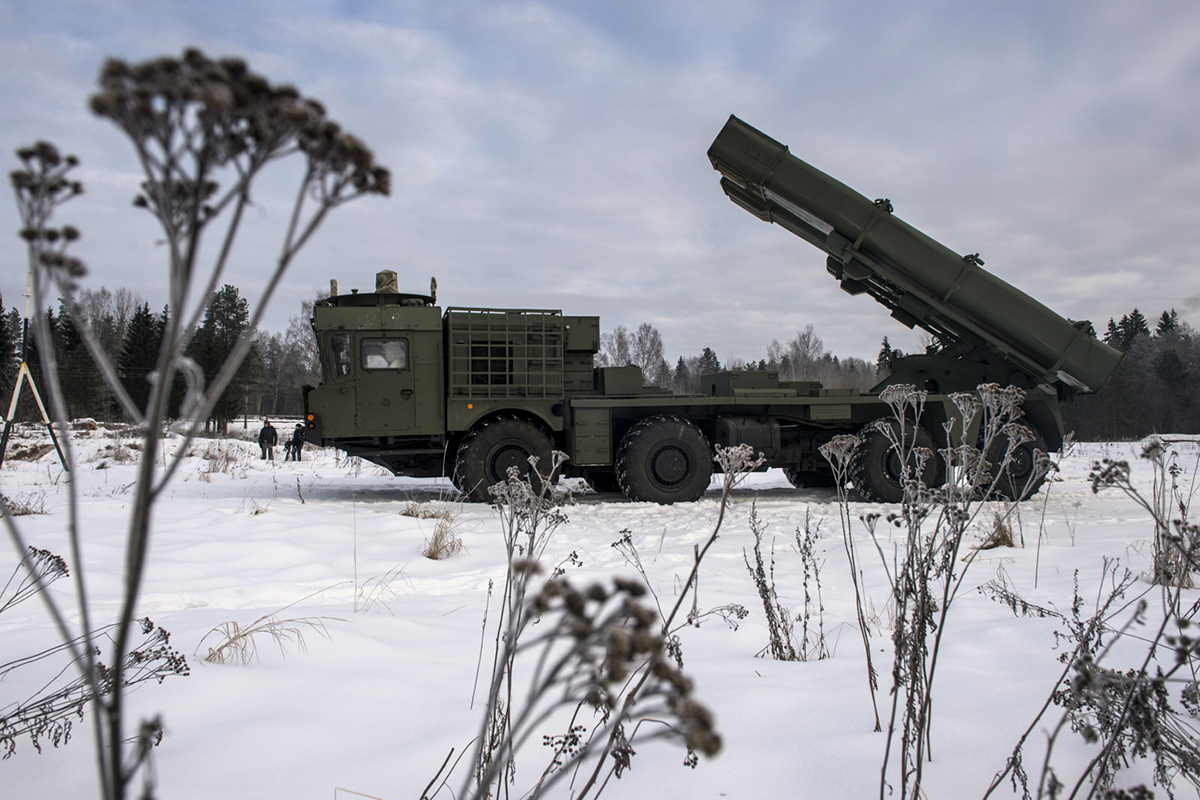
Uragan-1М.

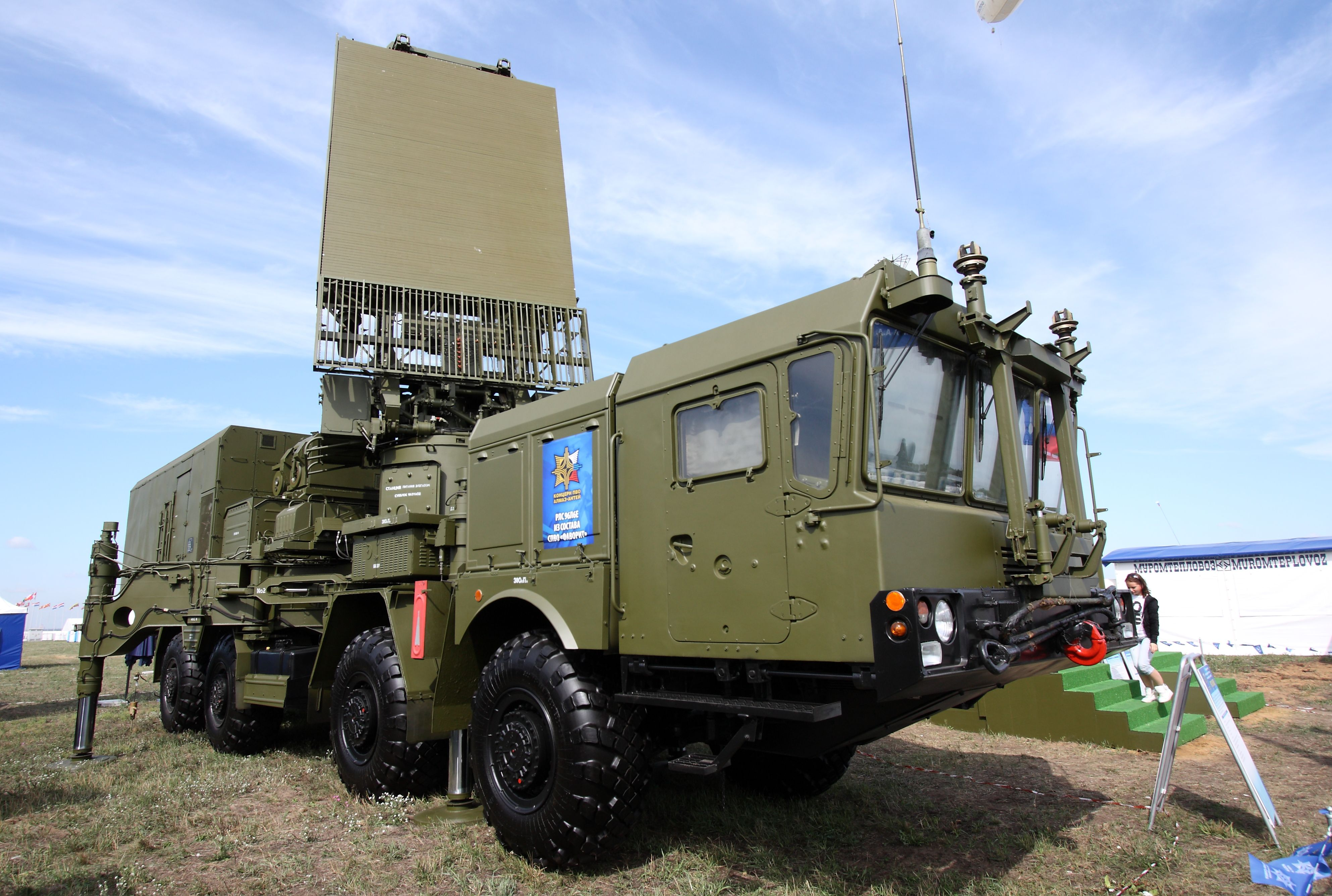
96L6E radar at the MAKS-2011.

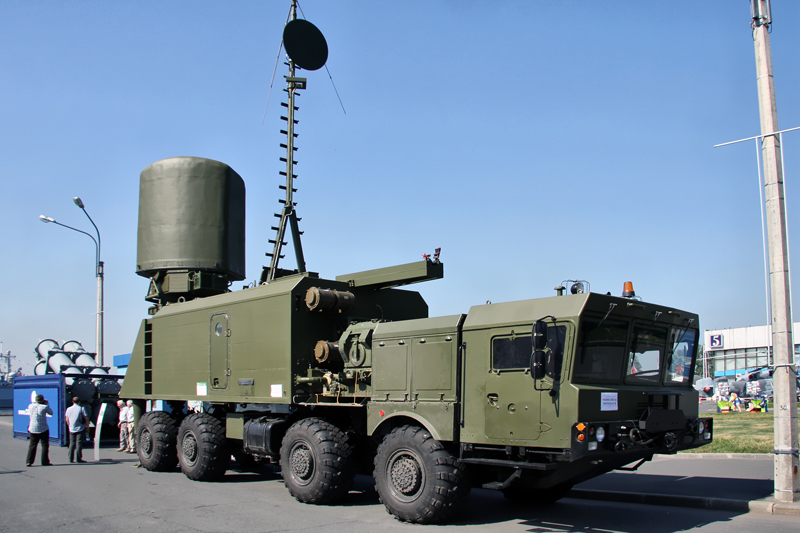
Monolit-B coastal surface and air reconnaissance system.

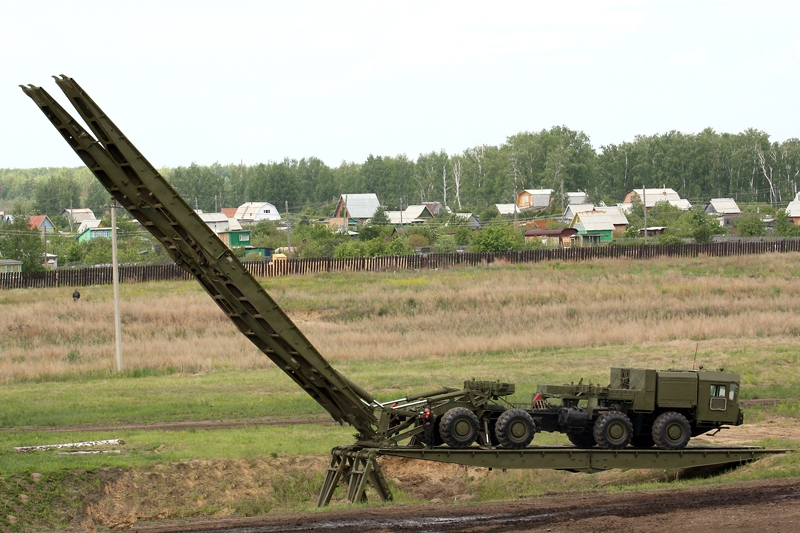
TMM-6 bridgelayer.

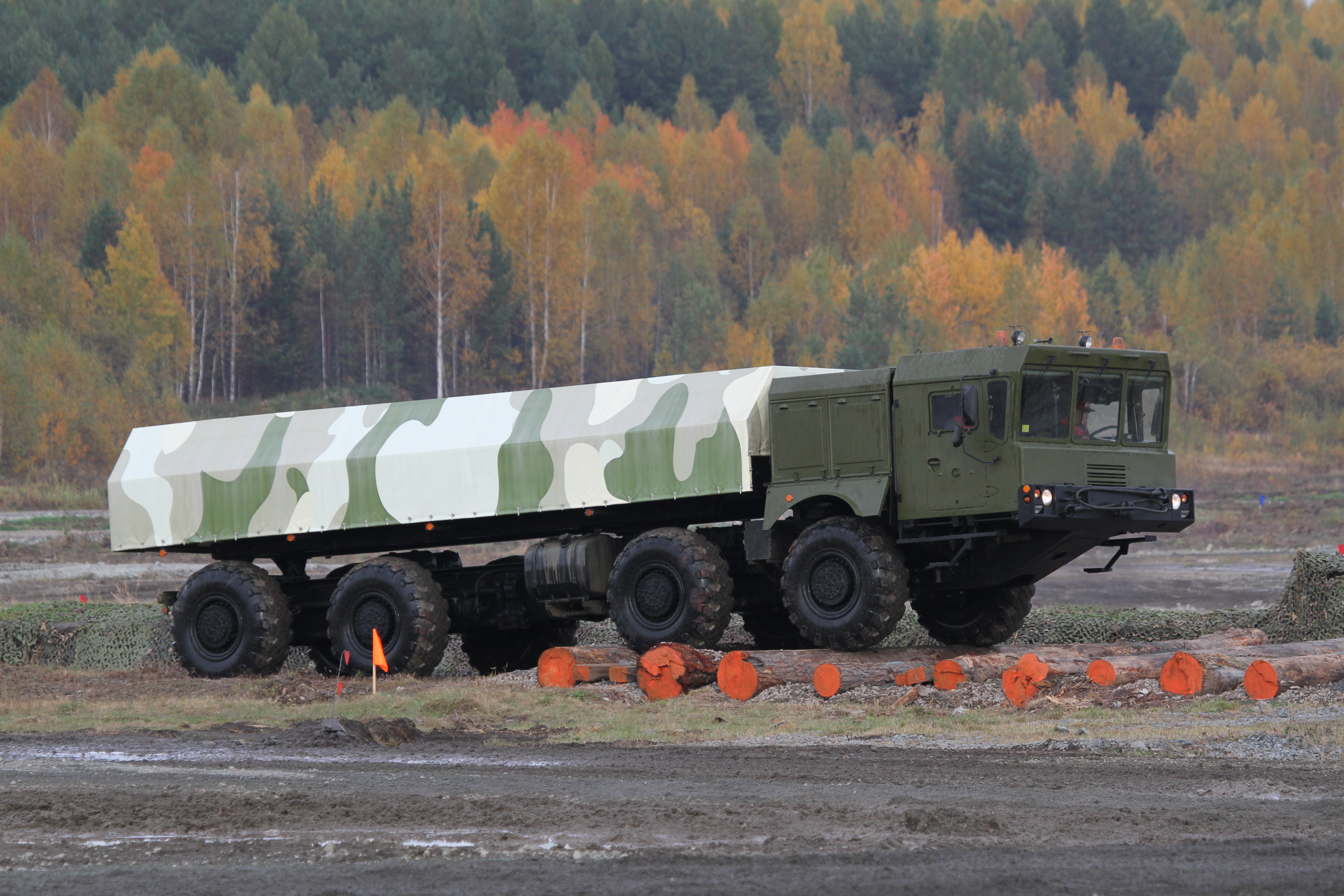
Russia Arms Expo 2013.

== Former operators ==
- Ba'athist Syria

== See also ==
- MAZ-7310
- MZKT-79221
- KAMAZ-7850
