= List of Kamaz vehicles =

This is a list of vehicles designed or produced by KAMAZ, a Russian truck manufacturer.

== Generations ==
Number	Year of production	Features	Photo
1. K1 (С)	1976	Diskless wheels. Low cabin roof before 1998. Corrugated sidewalls sleeping compartment. Lights on the front of the cab.	
2. K2 (C2)	1995	Increased height of the cab roof. Disc wheels. Rectangular lights on the bumper. New bumper with sidewalls. Underride underbody.	
3. K2 (C3)	2004	New surround bumper (double for tractors). New headlamps with headlamp swivel sections, which call on the sidewalls of the bumper. We haul tractors appeared high cab. Smooth walls of the sleeping compartment. Voluminous front fenders. Some of the trucks new plastic dashboard instead of metal	
4. K3 (R)	2009	Large-scale modernization. All new front of cabin, including new radiator grille. New front bumper. New headlight lens type in one case with swivel headlights. Plastic dashboard with electronic instrument cluster. Part of trucks equipped with Cummins engine manufacturing joint venture Cummins and KAMAZ in Naberezhnye Chelny.	
5	2013	Cabin from Mercedes-Benz Axor with some modifications	
6	?	Being developed – completely new cab – jointly with South Korean engineering company DMEC. Prototype trucks already presented	

== Models ==
Russia's President Vladimir Putin speaks about the 2,000,000th truck produced by Kamaz around the world, 2012.

=== Trucks ===
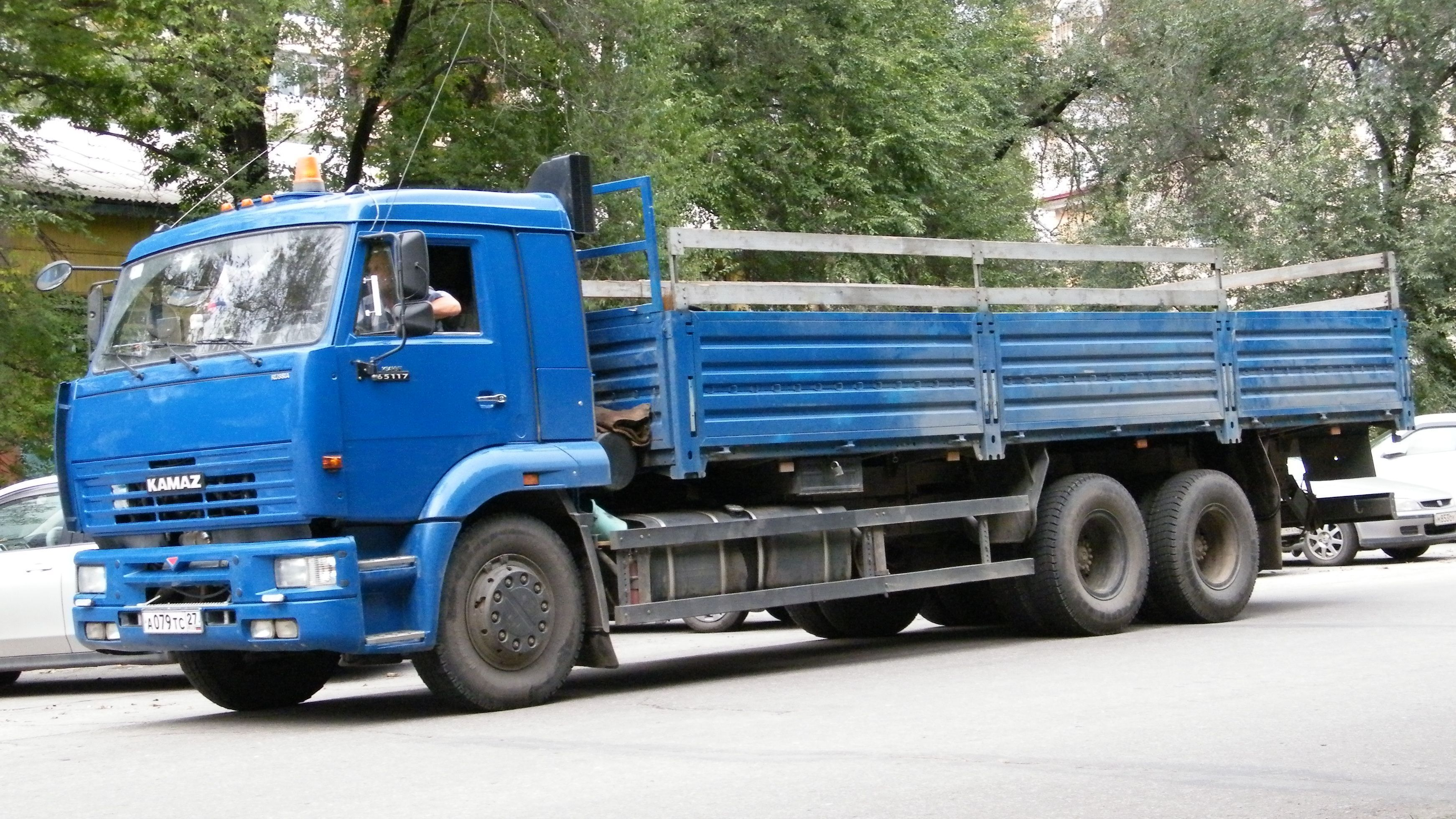
3rd Generations of KAMAZ. KamAZ-65117

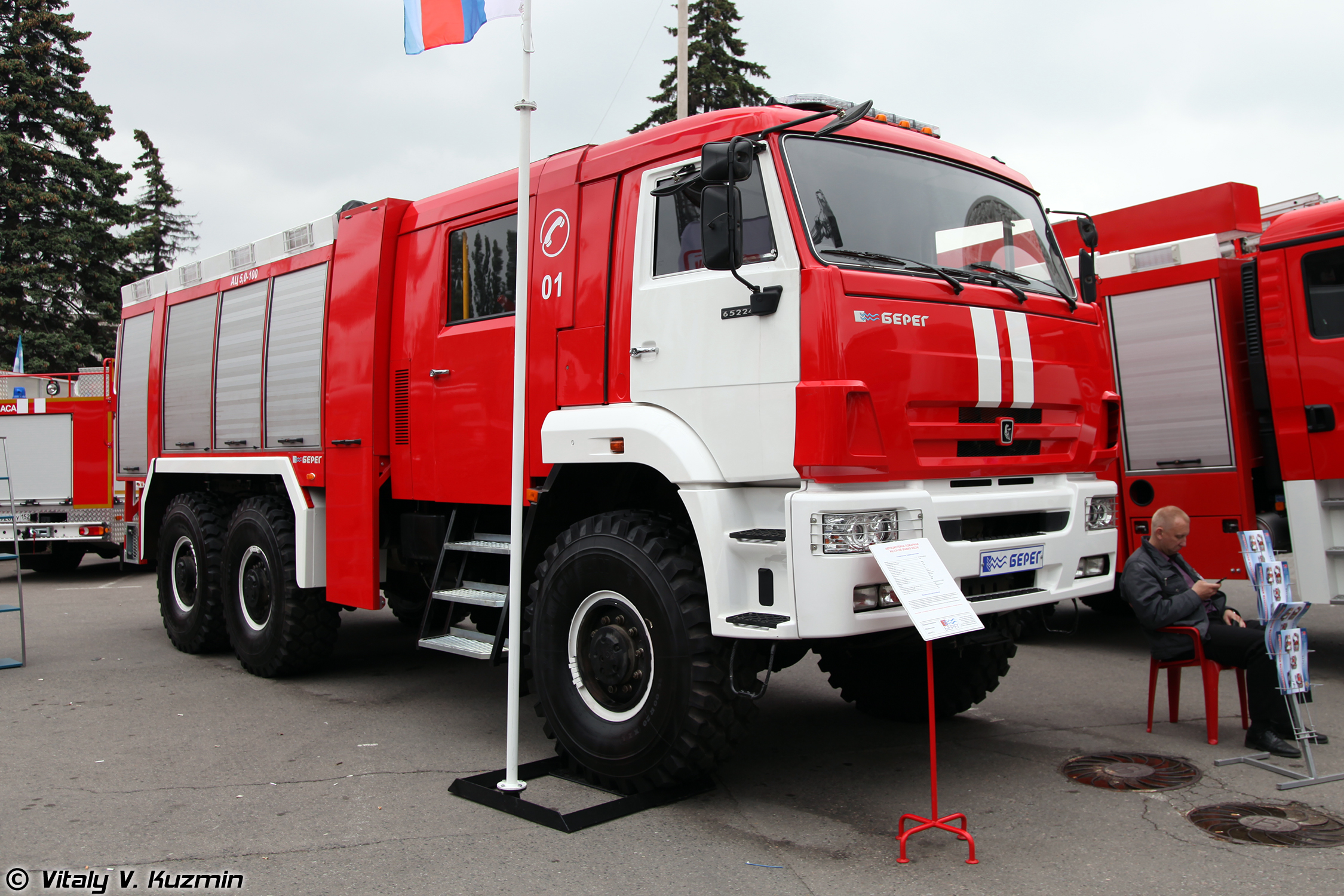
Firefighting vehicle ATs-5,0-100 on KamAZ-65224 chassis (4th Generation of KAMAZ trucks

From 1976 - 2015, KAMAZ has produced trucks as follows :

- KamAZ-4308 4×2 Medium-range truck & 4×2 Cab and Chassis Unit
- KamAZ-4310
- KamAZ-4326 4×4 Side truck & 4×4 Cab and Chassis Unit
- KamAZ-4326-9 Dakar 4×4 Dakar Rally Sport truck
- KamAZ-4911 Extreme 4×4 Civilian Sport truck Dakar Rally
- KamAZ-43114 6×6 Flat bed truck & 6×6 Cab and Chassis Unit
- KamAZ-43118 6×6 Flat bed truck & 6×6 Cab and Chassis Unit
- KamAZ-43253 4×2 Flat bed truck & 4×2 Cab and Chassis Unit
- KamAZ-53205 6×4 Cab and Chassis Unit
- KamAZ-53215 6×4 Flat bed truck & 6×4 Cab and Chassis Unit
- KamAZ-53228 6×6 Cab and Chassis Unit
- KamAZ-53229 6×4 Cab and Chassis Unit
- KamAZ-53205 6×4 Cab and Chassis Unit
- KamAZ-52212 6×4L Cab and Chassis Unit
- KamAZ-52213 6×4L Cab and Chassis Unit
- KamAZ-53605 4×2 Dump truck
- KamAZ-5513 6×4 Cab and Chassis Unit & 6×4 Garbage truck
- KamAZ-5320 6×4 Flat bed truck & 6×4 Cab and Chassis Unit
- KamAZ-53202 6×4 Flat bed truck & 6×4 Cab and Chassis Unit
- KamAZ-53212 6×4 Flat bed truck & 6×4 Cab and Chassis Unit
- KamAZ-53213 6×4 Flat bed truck & 6×4 Cab and Chassis Unit
- KamAZ-53229 6×4 Flat bed truck & 6×4 Cab and Chassis Unit
- KamAZ-53228 6×6 Flat bed truck & 6×6 Cab and Chassis Unit
- KamAZ-5511 6×4 Dump truck
- KamAZ-5512 6×6 Dump truck
- KamAZ-45141 6×6 Dump truck
- KamAZ-54115 6×4 Tractor truck & 6×4 Cab and Chassis Unit
- KamAZ-55111 6×4 Dump truck & 6×4 Cab and Chassis Unit
- KamAZ-6520 6×4 Dump truck & 6×4 Cab and Chassis Unit
- KamAZ-6522 6×6 Dump truck & 6×6 Cab and Chassis Unit
- KamAZ-6540 8×4 Dump truck & 8×4 Cab and Chassis Unit
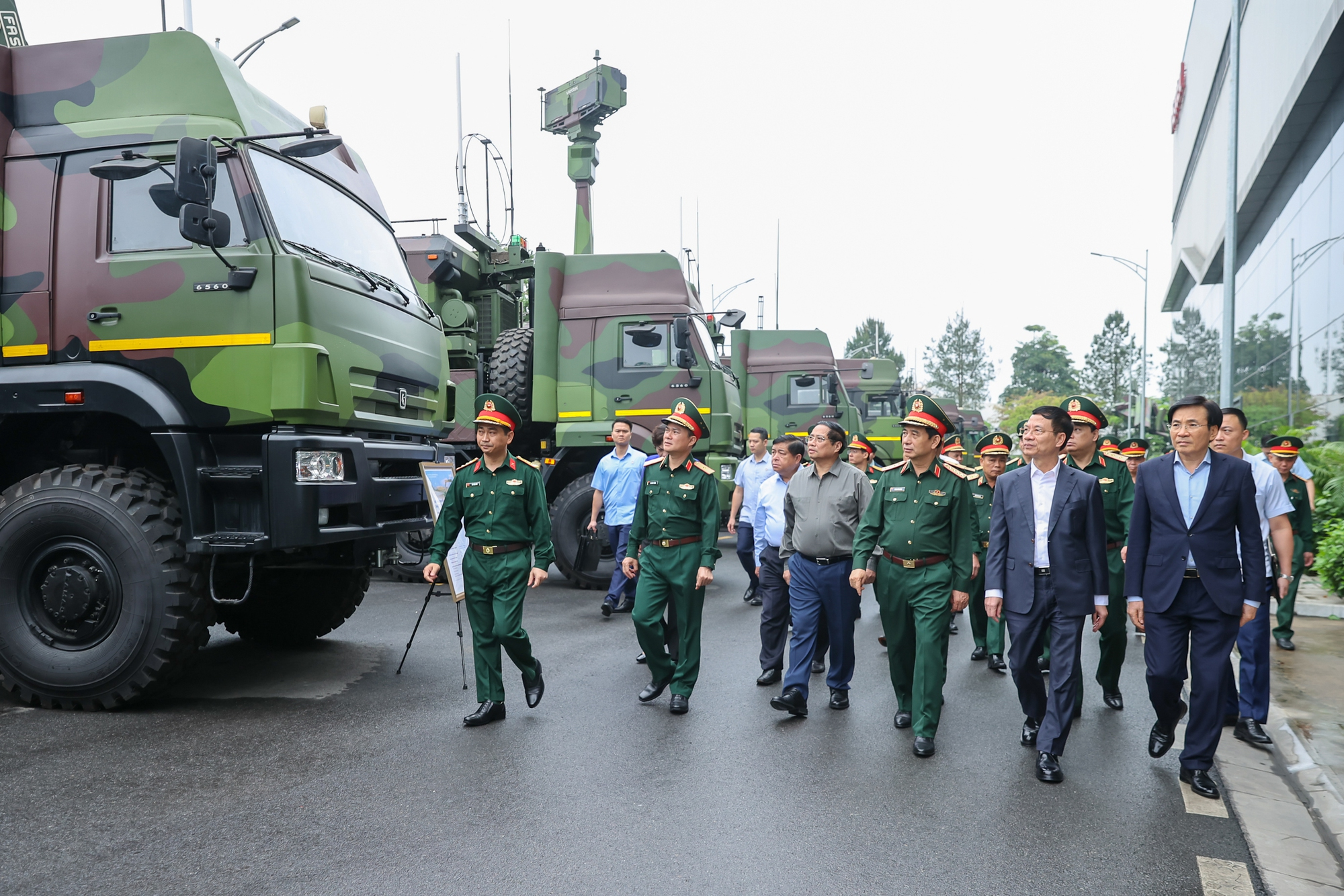
- Numerous KamAZ-6560 chassis being utilized for Viettel defense systems.
  KamAZ-6560 8×8 Cab and Chassis Unit
- KamAZ-5360 4×2 Cab and Chassis Unit
- KamAZ-53602 6×2 Cab and Chassis Unit
- KamAZ-43082 6×2 Cab and Chassis Unit
- KamAZ-6360 6×4 Cab and Chassis Unit
- KamAZ-53228 6×6 Cab and Chassis Unit
- KamAZ-53229 6×4 Cab and Chassis Unit
- KamAZ-5523 6×6 Logging truck
- KamAZ-63968 Typhoon 6×6 Armored infantry transport
- KamAZ-65111 6×6 Dump truck
- KamAZ-65115 6×4 Dump truck & 6×4 Cab and Chassis Unit
- KamAZ-65116 6×4 Tractor truck
- KamAZ-65117 6×4 Flat bed truck & 6×4 Cab and Chassis Unit

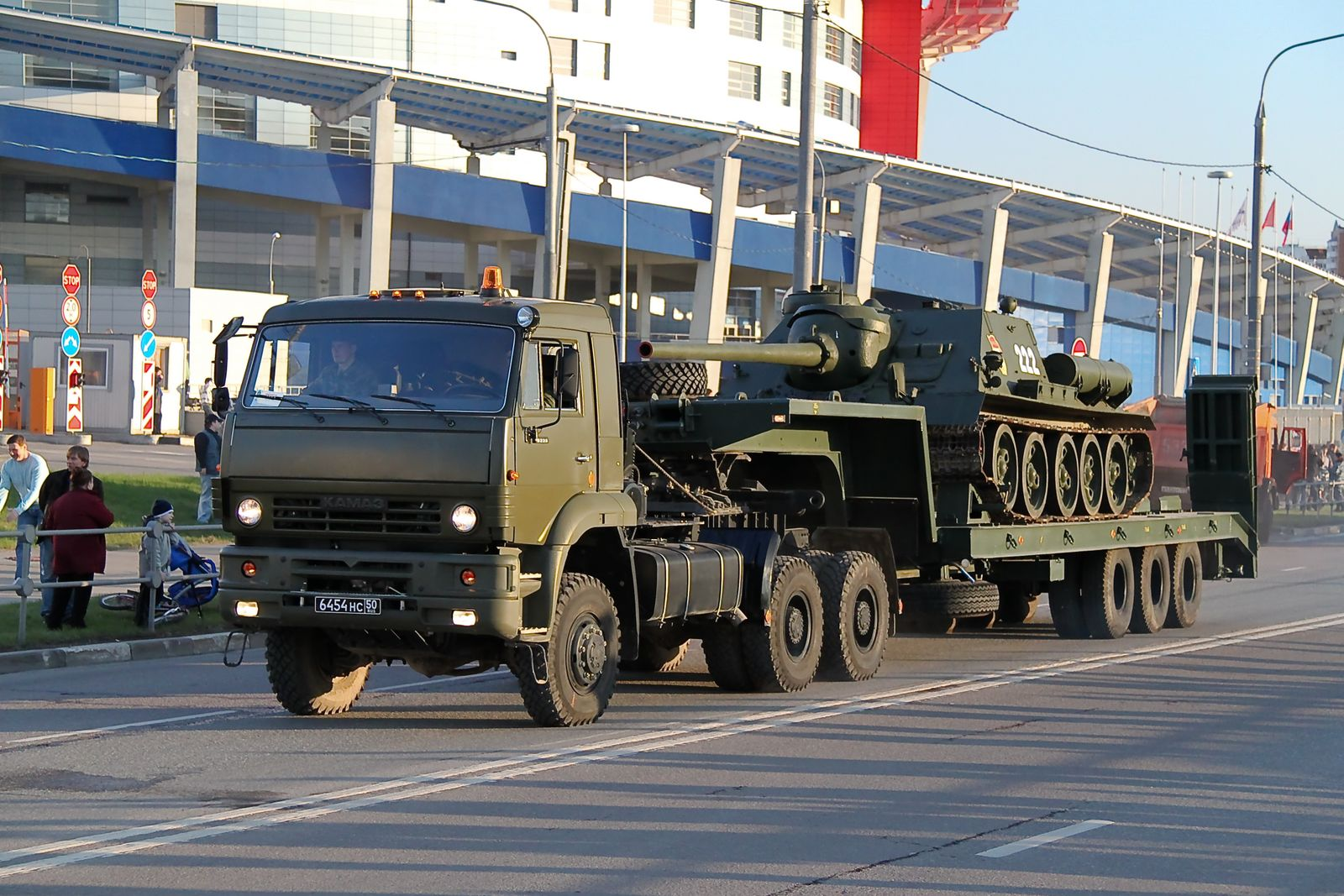
Military tank transporter KamAZ-65225 with an SU-85 at the parade rehearsal in Red Square

=== Tractor truck ===
- KamAZ-6440 6x4 Tractor truck
- KamAZ-65116 6x4 Tractor truck
- KamAZ-6460 "Continent" 6x4 Tractor truck
- KamAZ-6460-73 6x4 Tractor truck
- KamAZ-5460 "Continent" 4x2 Tractor truck
- KamAZ-5460-73 4x2 Tractor truck
- KamAZ-5460-06 "Cummins" 4x2 Tractor truck
- KamAZ-5470 4x2 Tractor truck
- KamAZ-5490 4x2 Tractor truck
- KamAZ-5410 6x4 Tractor truck
- KamAZ-54101 6x4 Tractor truck
- KamAZ-54102 6x4 Tractor truck
- KamAZ-54112 6x4 Tractor truck
- KamAZ-54105 6x4 Tractor truck
- KamAZ-5415 4x2 Tractor truck
- KamAZ-5415M 4x2 Tractor truck
- KamAZ-5425 4x2 Tractor truck
- KamAZ-5425M 4x2 Tractor truck
- KamAZ-44108 6x6 Tractor truck
- KamAZ-65225 6x6 Tractor truck
- KamAZ-65226 6x6 Tractor truck
- KamAZ-65228 8x8 Tractor truck

=== Other vehicles ===
- KamAZ-4310 6x6 Cab and Chassis Unit
- KamAZ-43269 Vystrel (BPM-97) Wheeled armoured vehicle
- KAMAZ Barhan 4x4 multipurpose vehicle, a large prototype SUV built on a KamAZ-43501 chassis, made by CaRS, a private company. Original prototype was on a GAZ-66 chassis.
- KamAZ-6559 (Jupiter 30) Self-driving dump truck intended for unmanned transportation of broken run of ore developed in collaboration with Zyfra and Bauman Moscow State Technical University. The truck was introduced in June 2022.

=== Kamaz Mustang ===
The KamAZ Мустанг (Mustang) is a family of general military utility trucks with numerous variants. The family is based on the 1st generation KamAZ family launched in the early 1980s. A three-person cab is standard across the Mustang range. It has a sleeping berth and tilts forward for engine access. This cab can be fitted with an add-on armour kit.

The Mustang family is available in eight (8) models:

Original three:

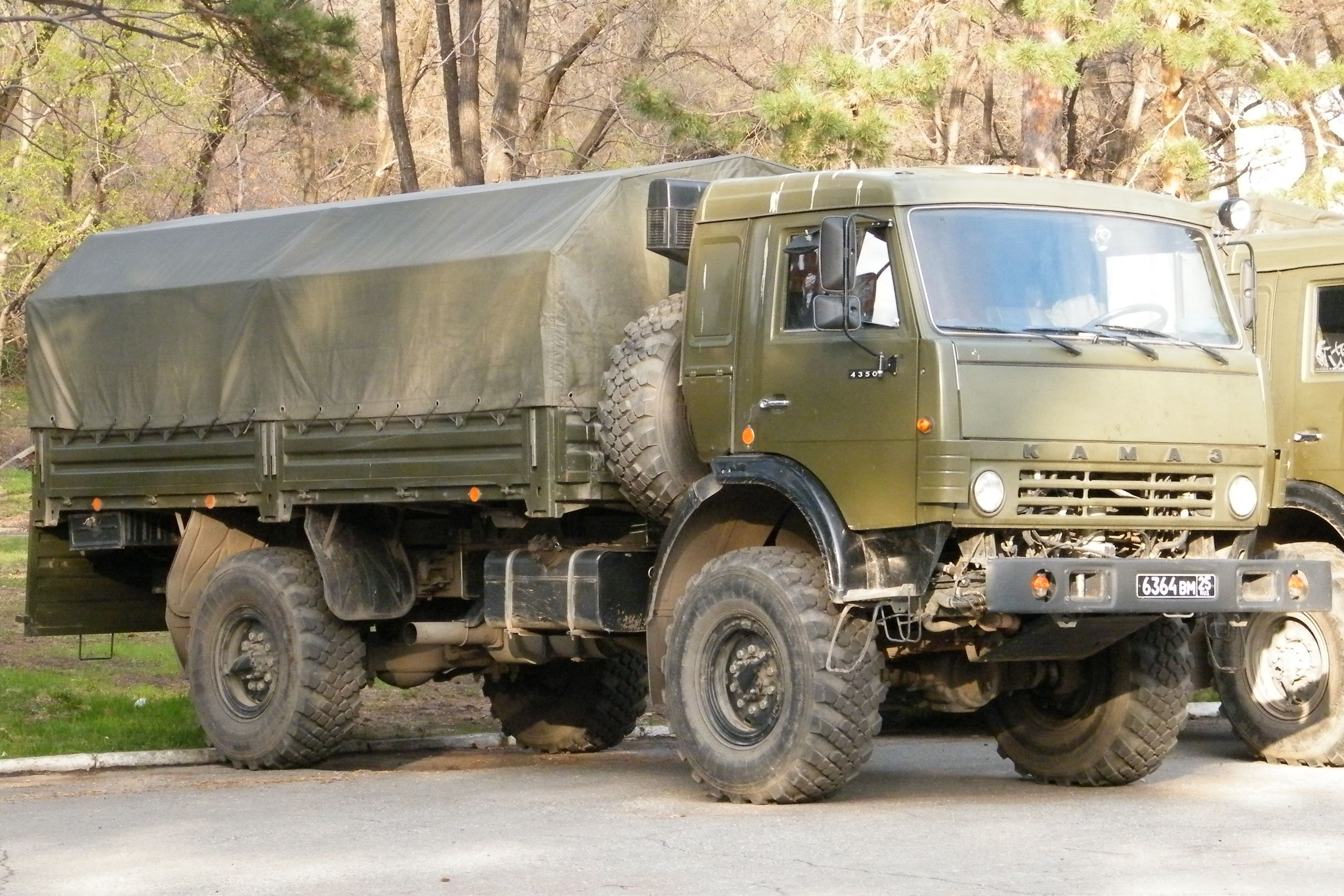
KamAZ-4350 4x4

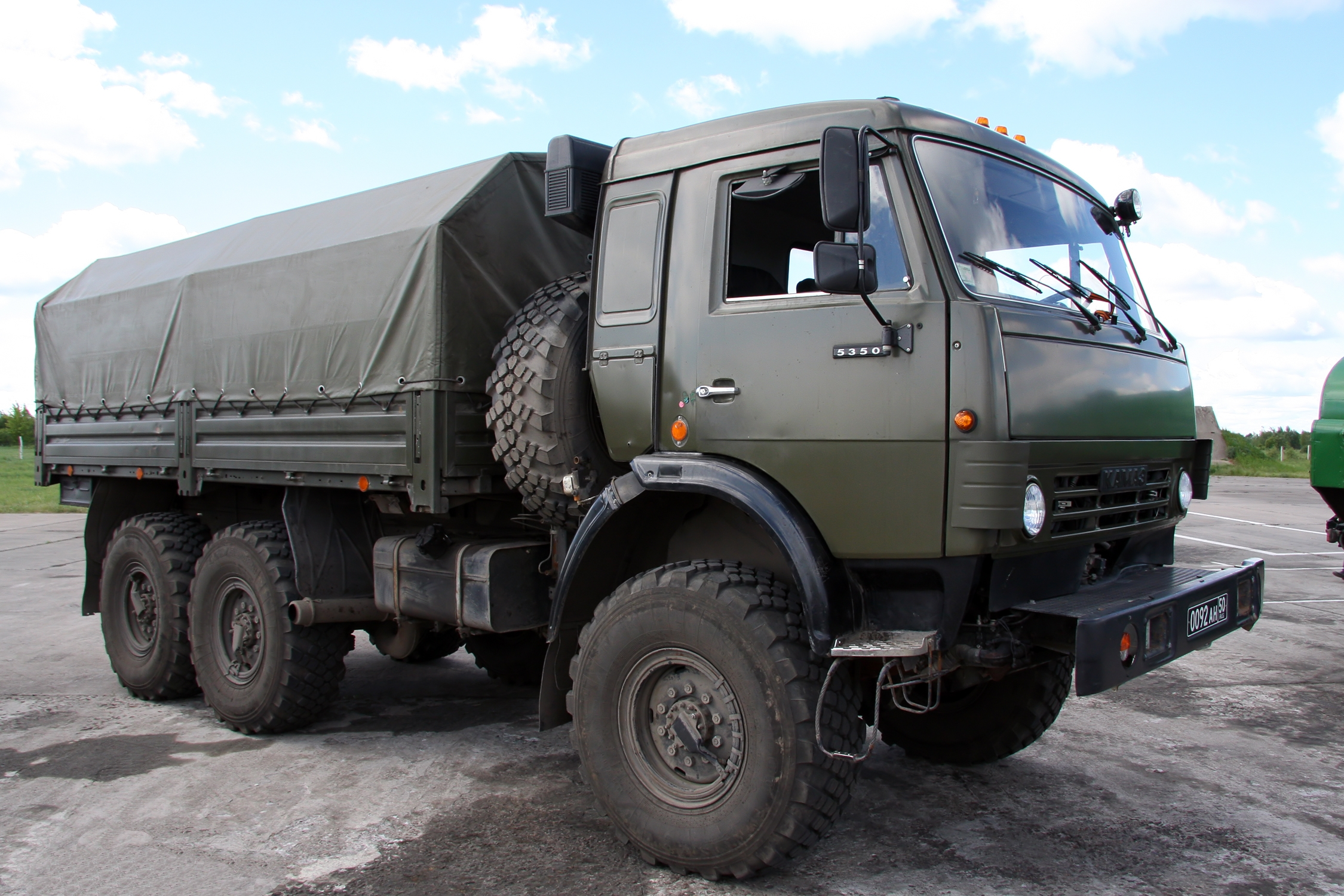
KamAZ-5350 6x6

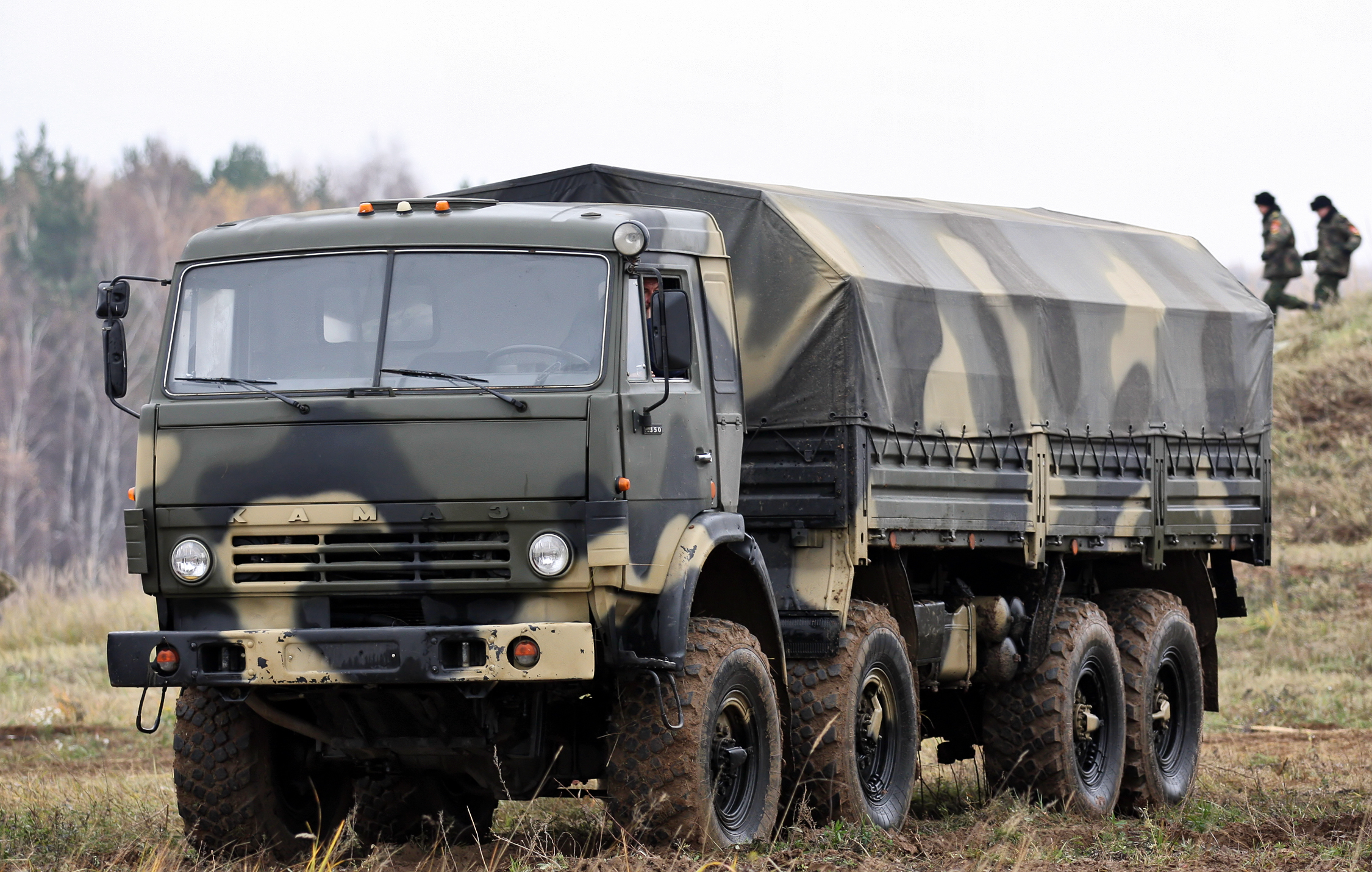
KamAZ-6350 8x8

And the KamAZ-43501, KamAZ-5450, KamAZ-6450, and KamAZ-5350 trucks with armoured cabs.:

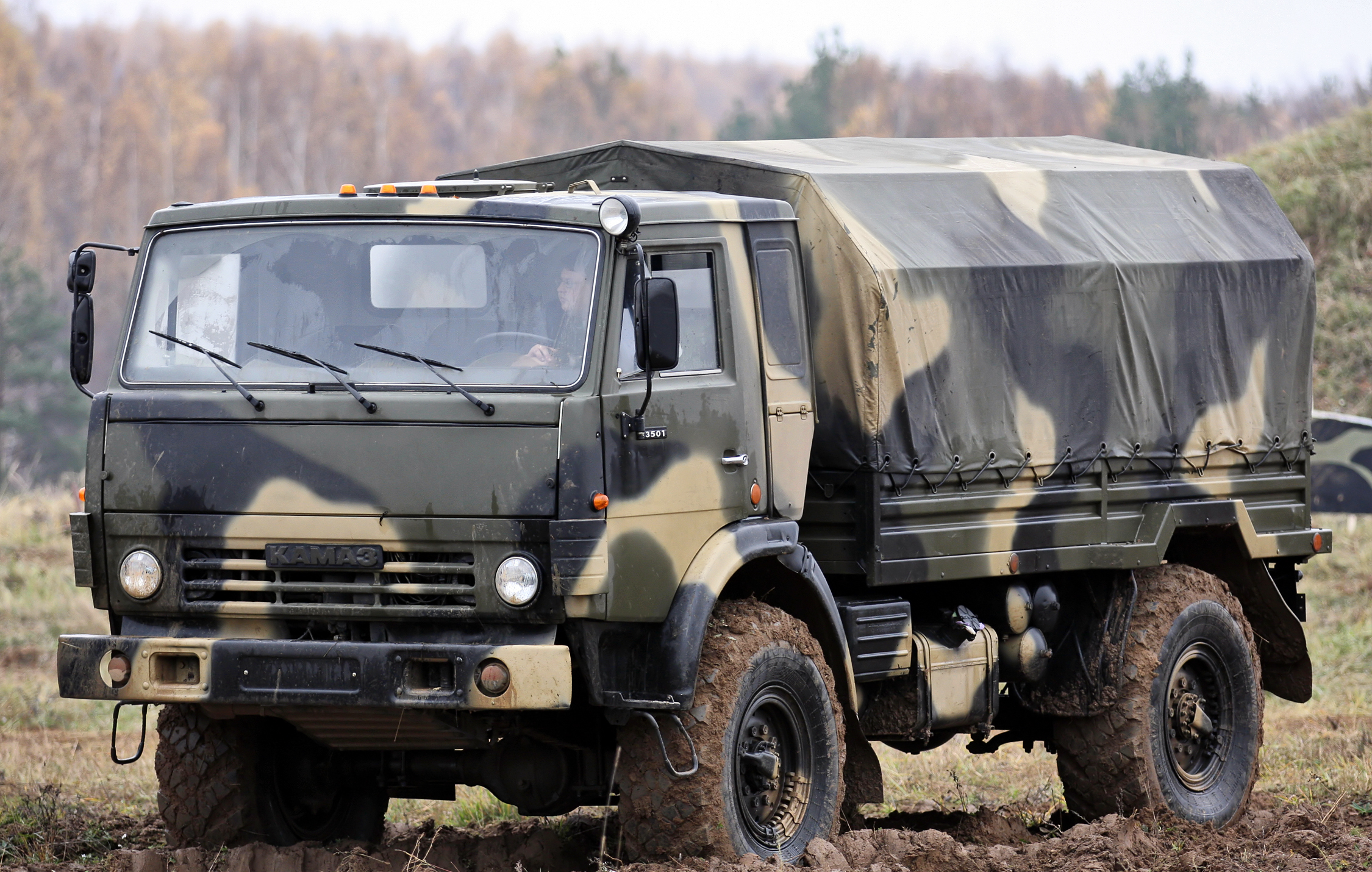
KamAZ-43501 for Russian Airborne Troops (VDV) 4x4 short wheelbase truck

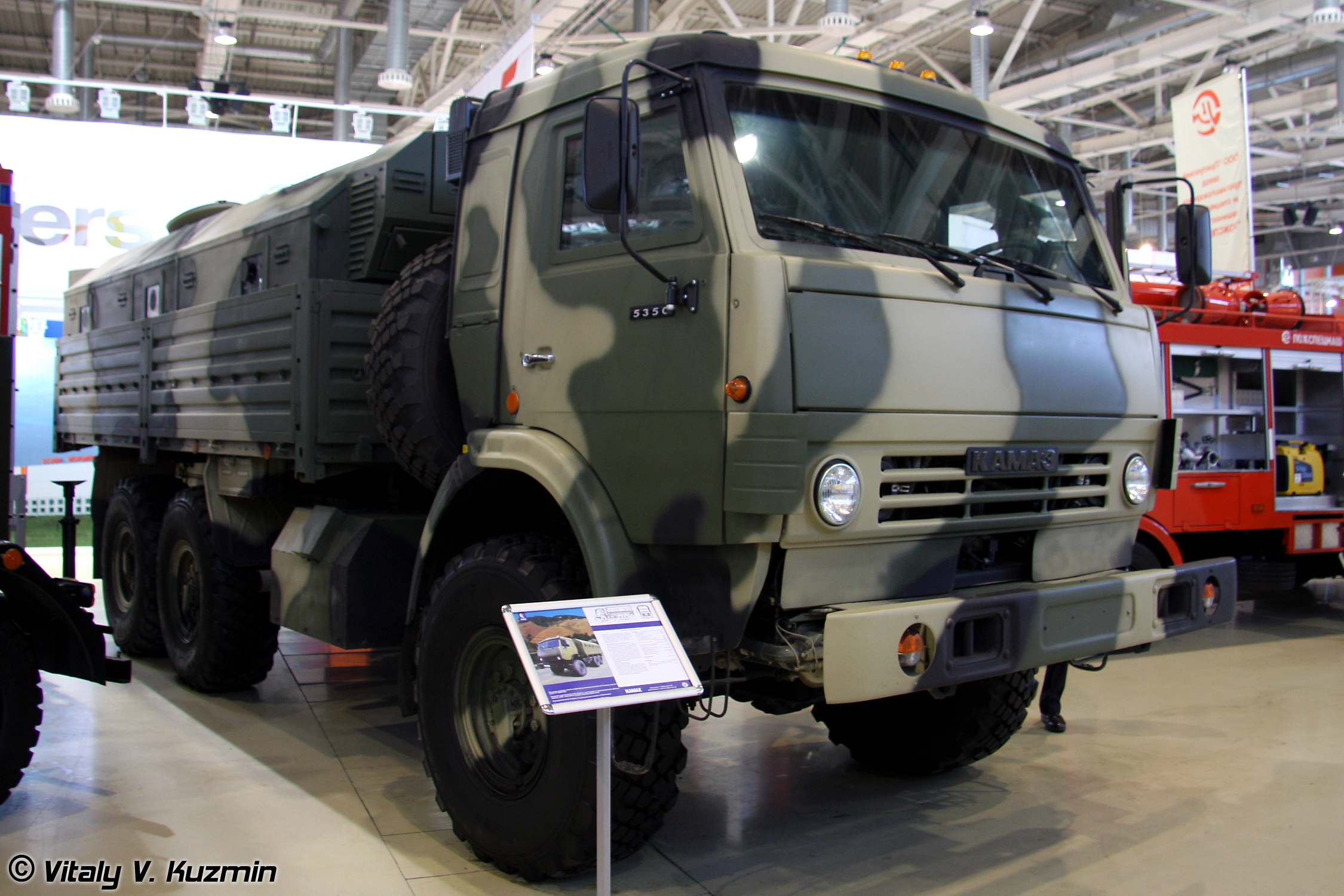
KamAZ-5350 6x6 with armored cab and multi-functional armored module MM 501.

=== Engines ===
KAMAZ Engines

- KamAZ-740.10 180 - 210 HP V8
- KamAZ-740.31 225 - 240 HP V8 Turbo Euro 0
- KamAZ-740.73 400 HP V8 Turbo Euro 4
- KamAZ-740.622 280 HP V8 Turbo Euro 3
- KamAZ-740.632 400 HP V8 Turbo Euro 4
- KamAZ-740.662 300 HP V8 Turbo Euro 4
- KamAZ-740.602 360 HP V8 Turbo Euro 3
- KamAZ-740.652 260 HP V8 Turbo Euro 3
- KamAZ-7403.10 260 HP V8 Turbo Euro 0
- KamAZ-74037.10 260 HP V8 Turbo Euro 0
- KamAZ-74006.10 220 HP V8 Turbo
- KamAZ-7409 series 180 - 360 HP V8 Turbo (240HP - 360HP) Euro 3 - 4 (240HP - 360HP)

KAMAZ Cummins

- Cummins ISB6.7e4 245 - 300 HP I6 Turbo Euro 2 - 4
- Cummins ISB6.5e4 185 HP I6 Turbo Euro 2
- 1989 360HP Cummins L6 Turbo Euro 2

KAMAZ Mercedes

- Daimler OM457LA 428 HP I6 Turbo Euro 5

== Gallery ==
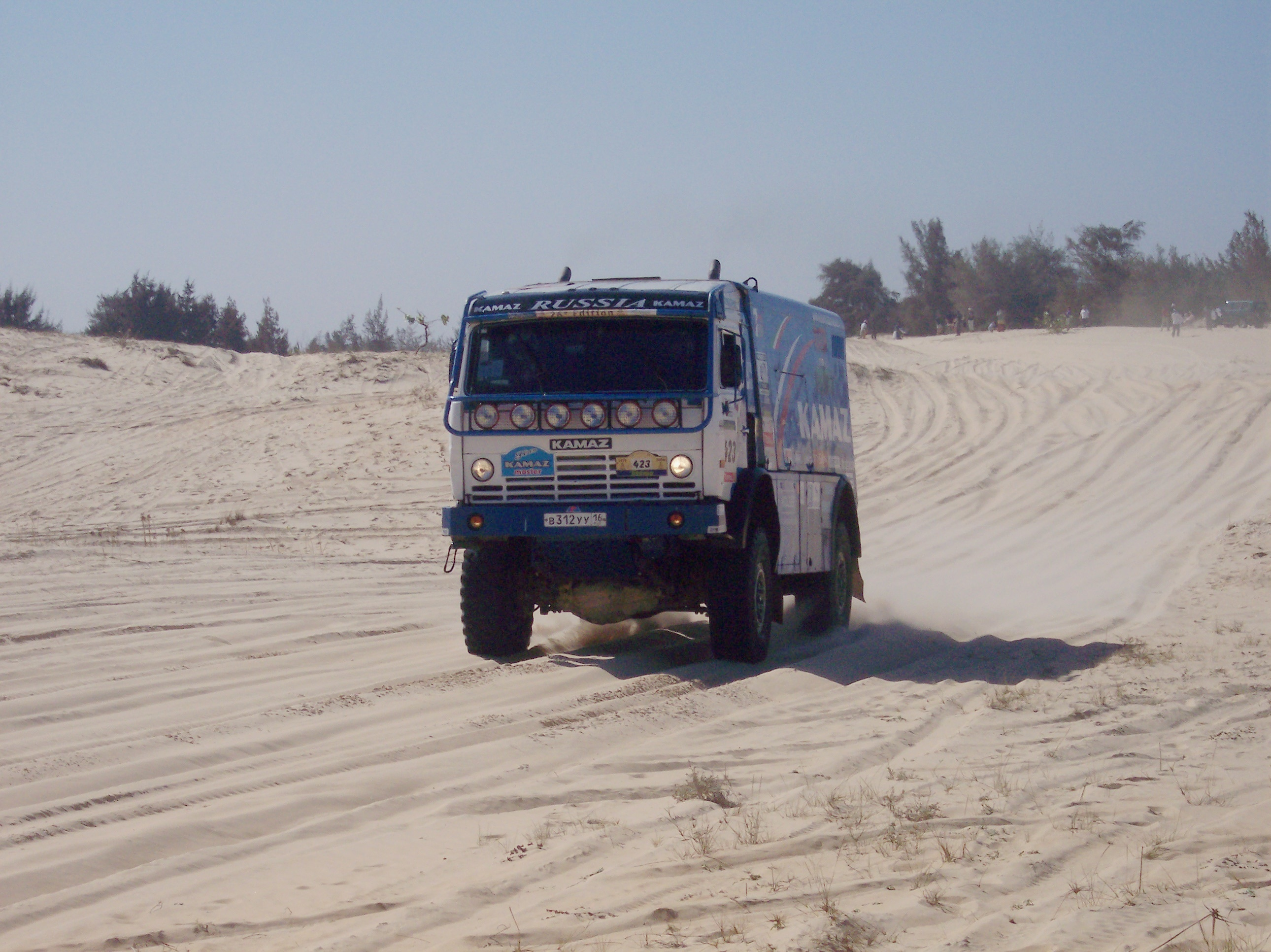
Russian KamAZ-4911, twelve time Dakar winner.

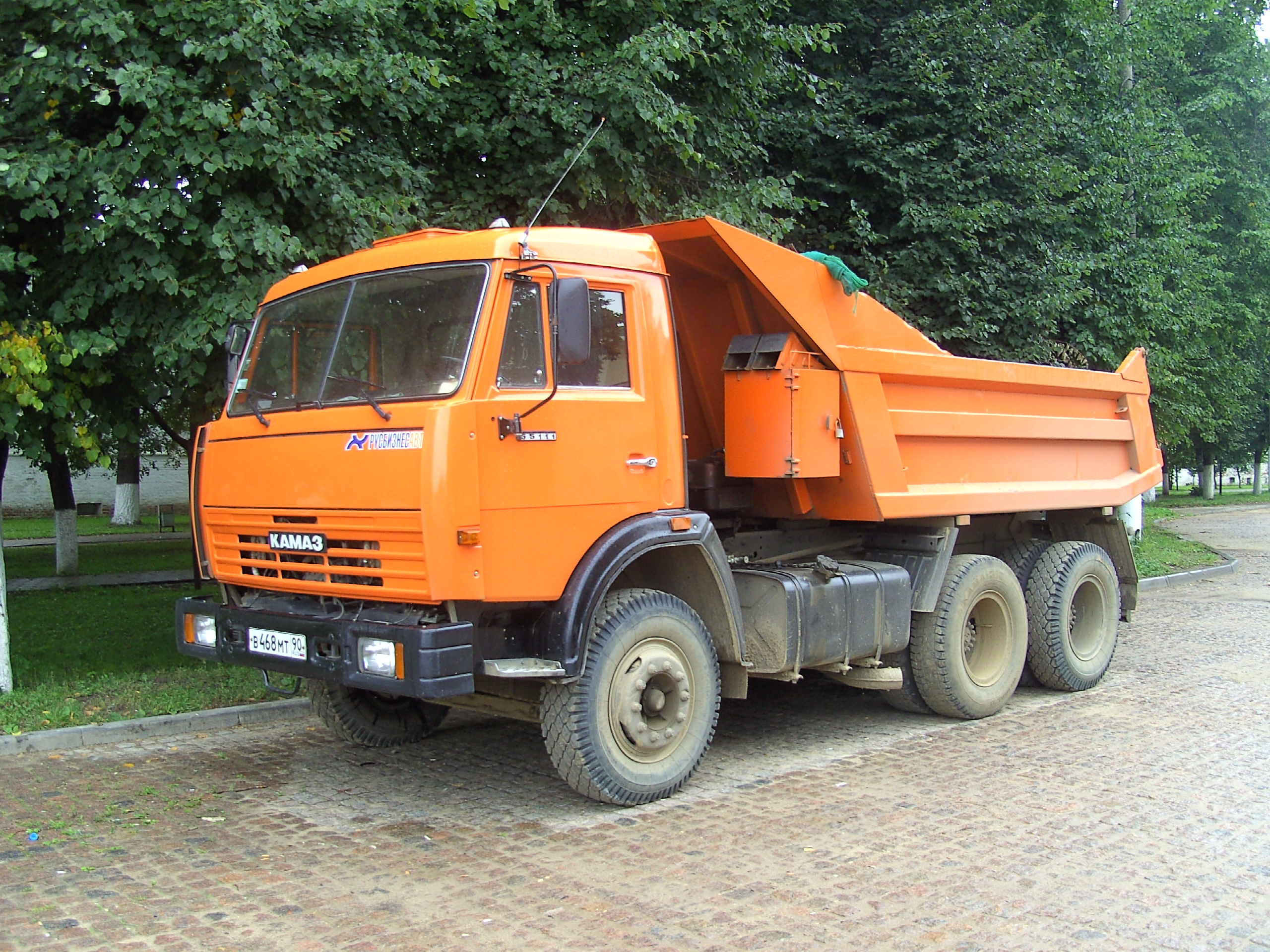
KamAZ-55111 in Russia.

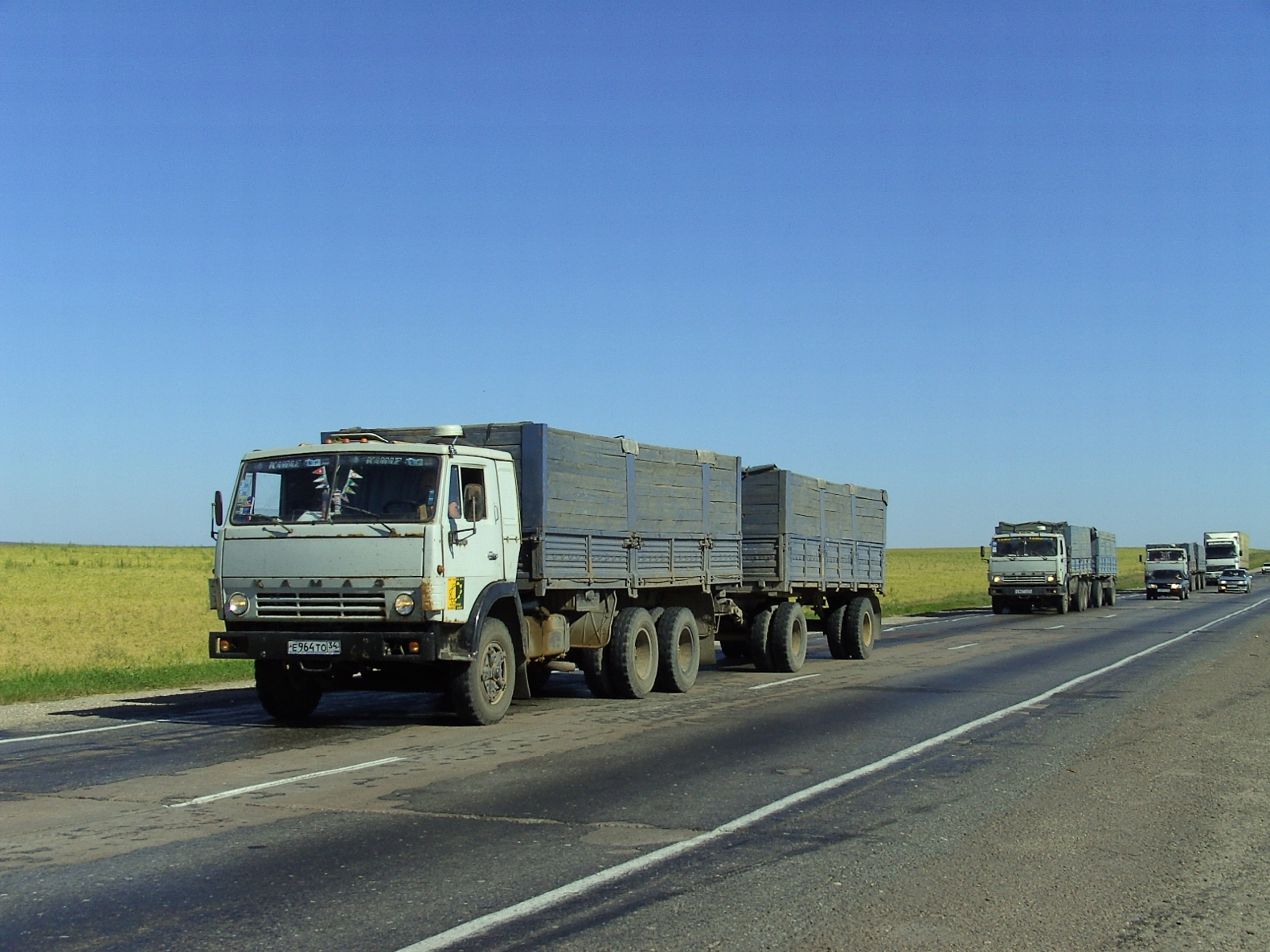
KamAZ-5320 with a full-trailer.

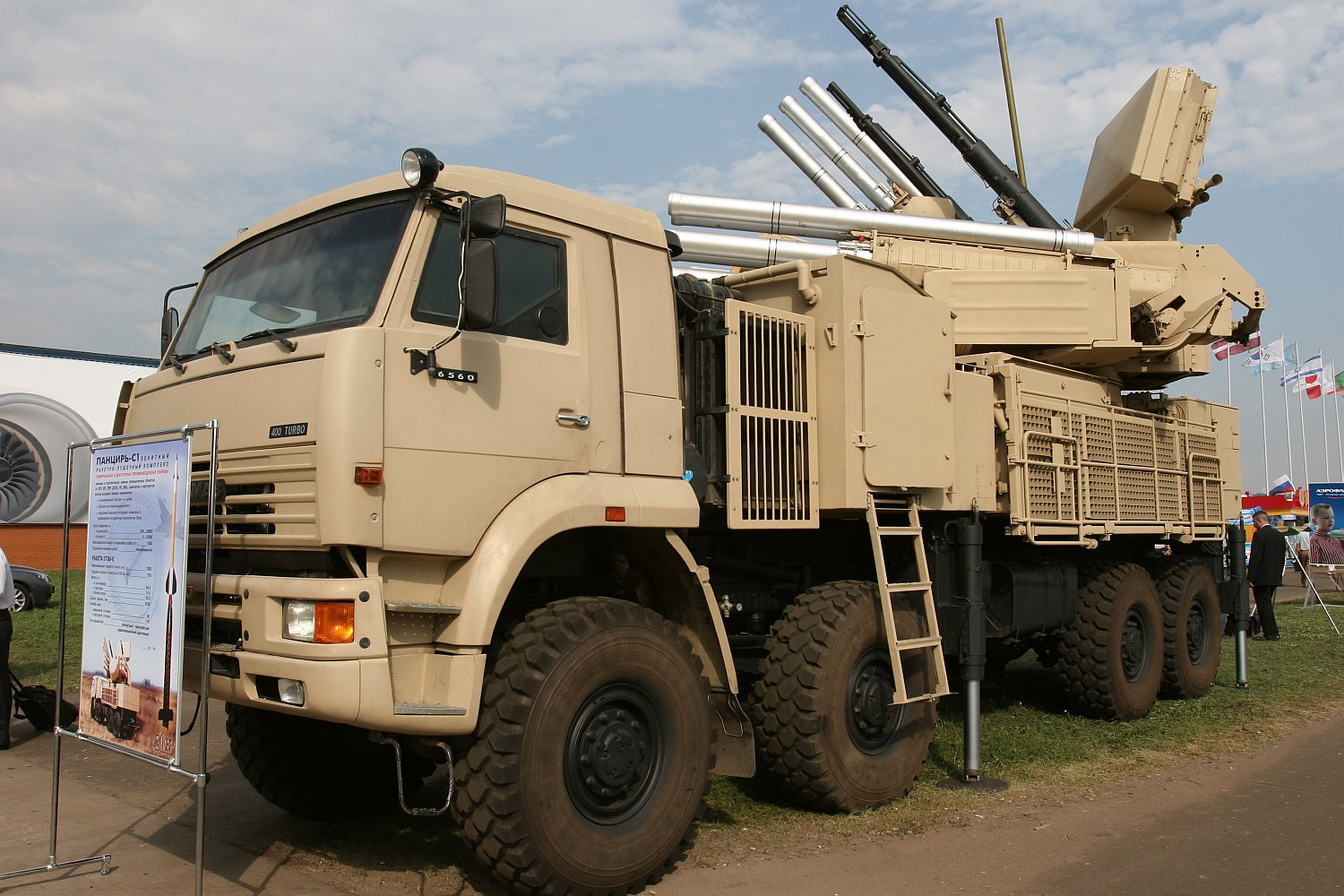
KAMAZ military truck mounted with Pantsir-S1 air defense system.

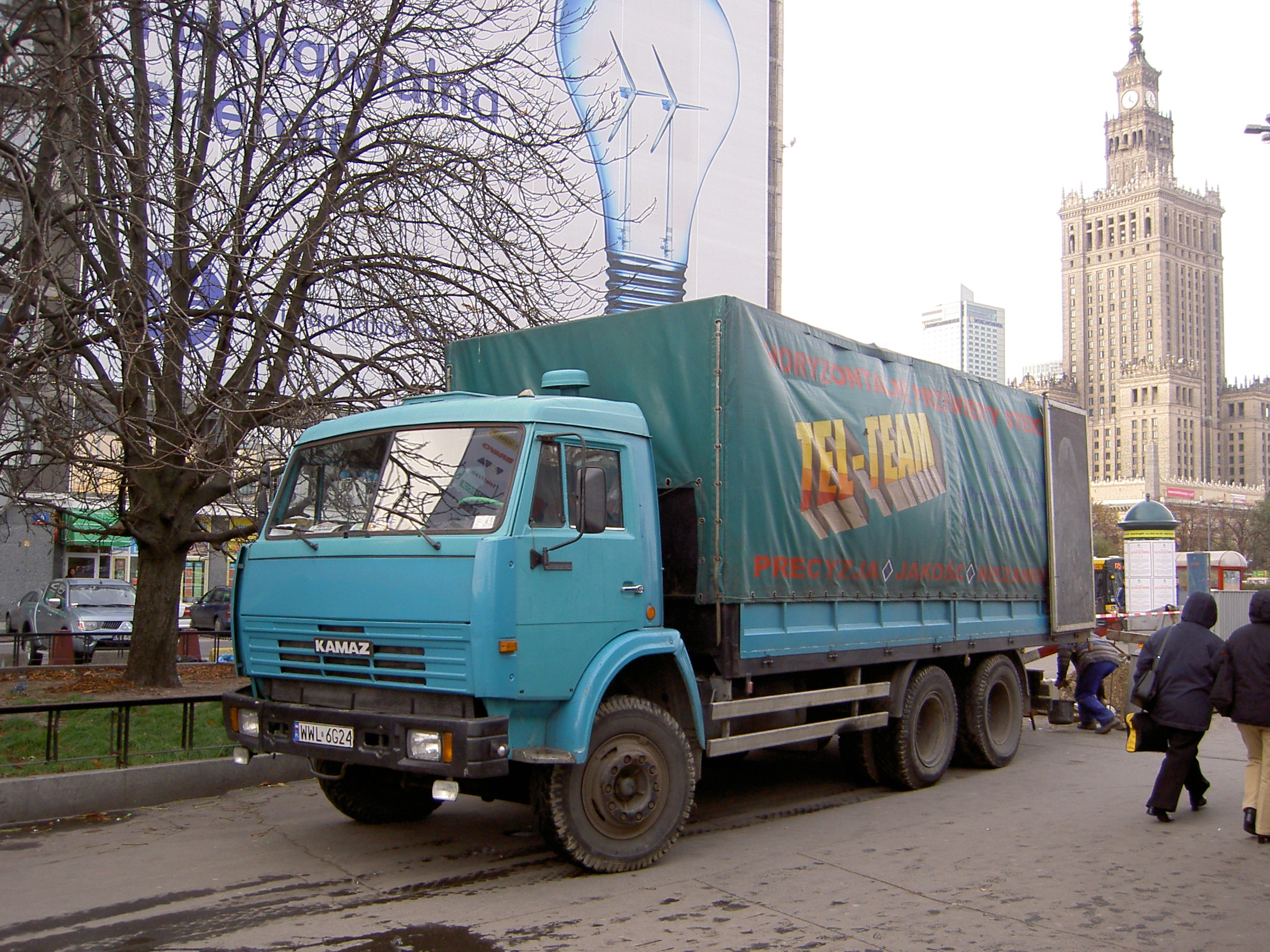
KamAZ-53215 in center of Warsaw.

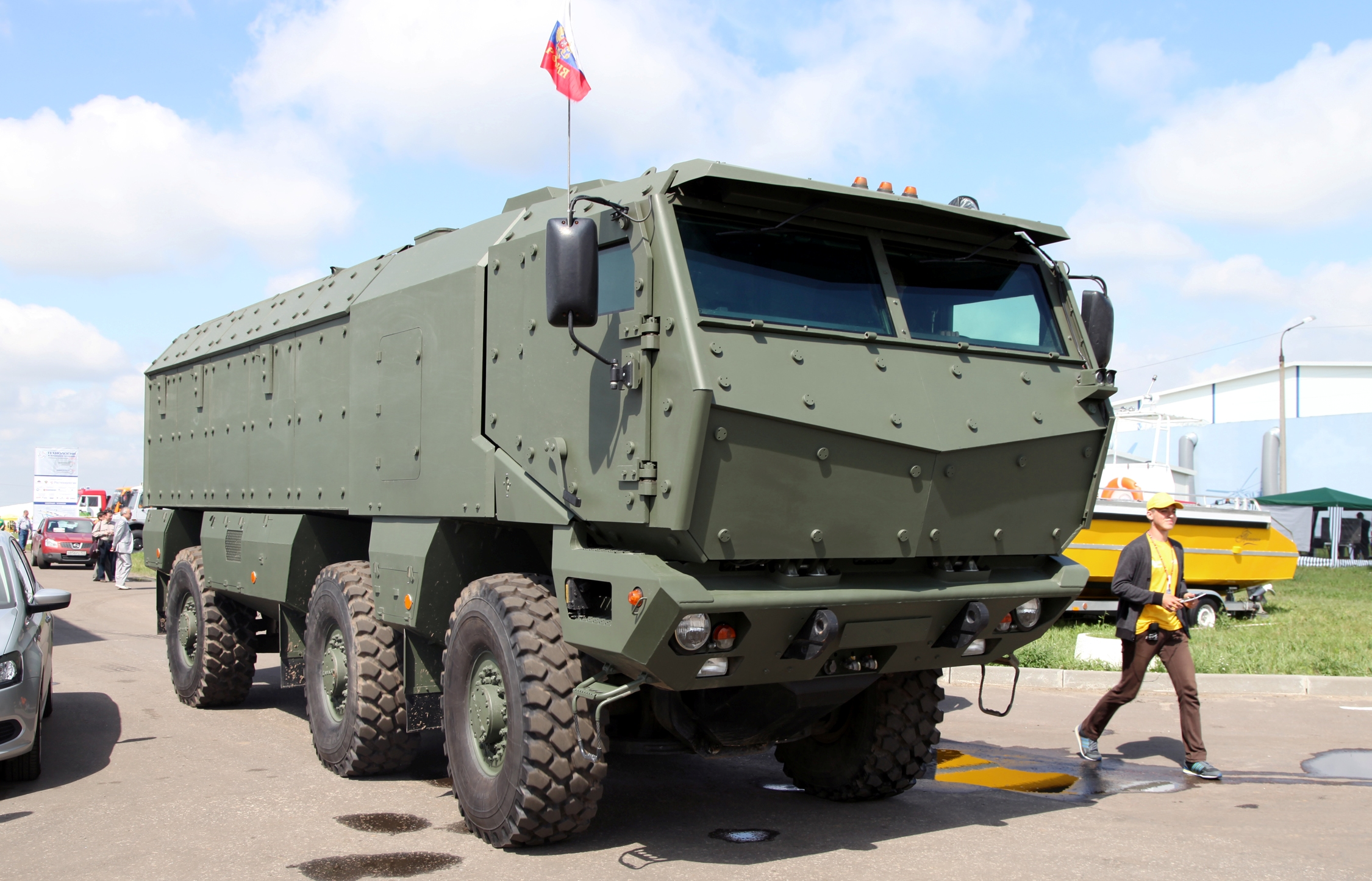
KamAZ-63968 Typhoon armored vehicle.

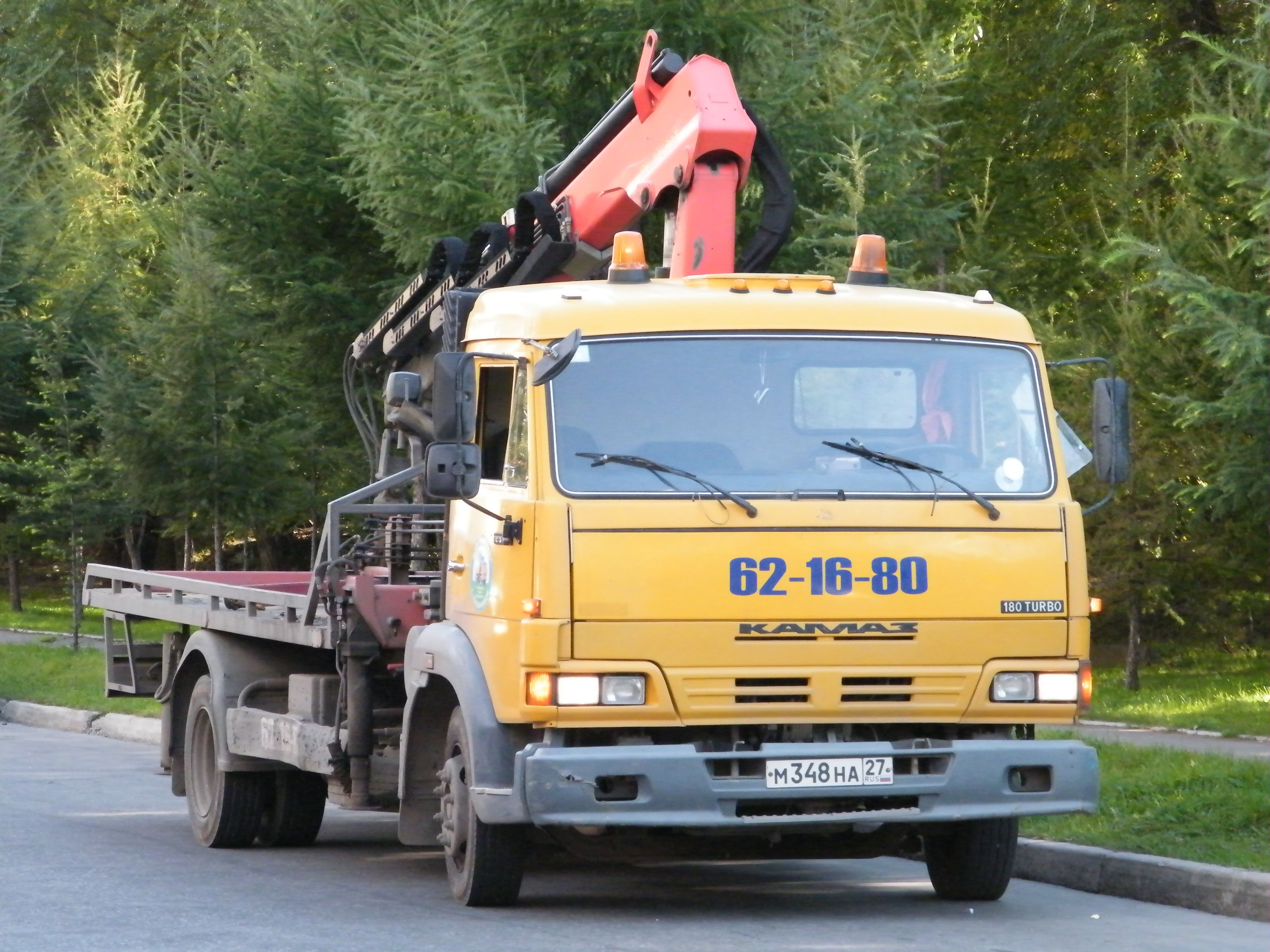
KamAZ-4308

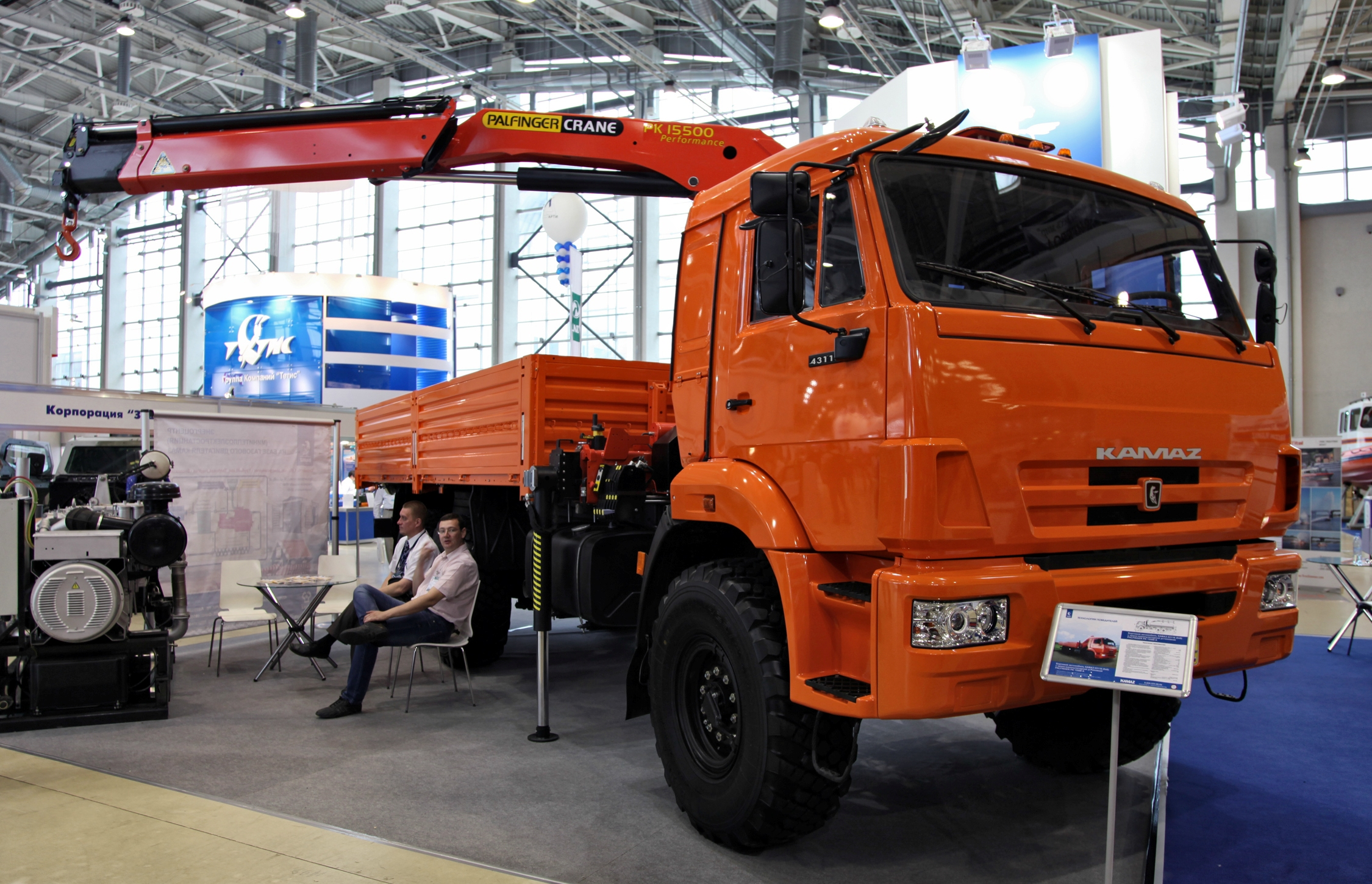
KamAZ-43118 with a Palfinger crane

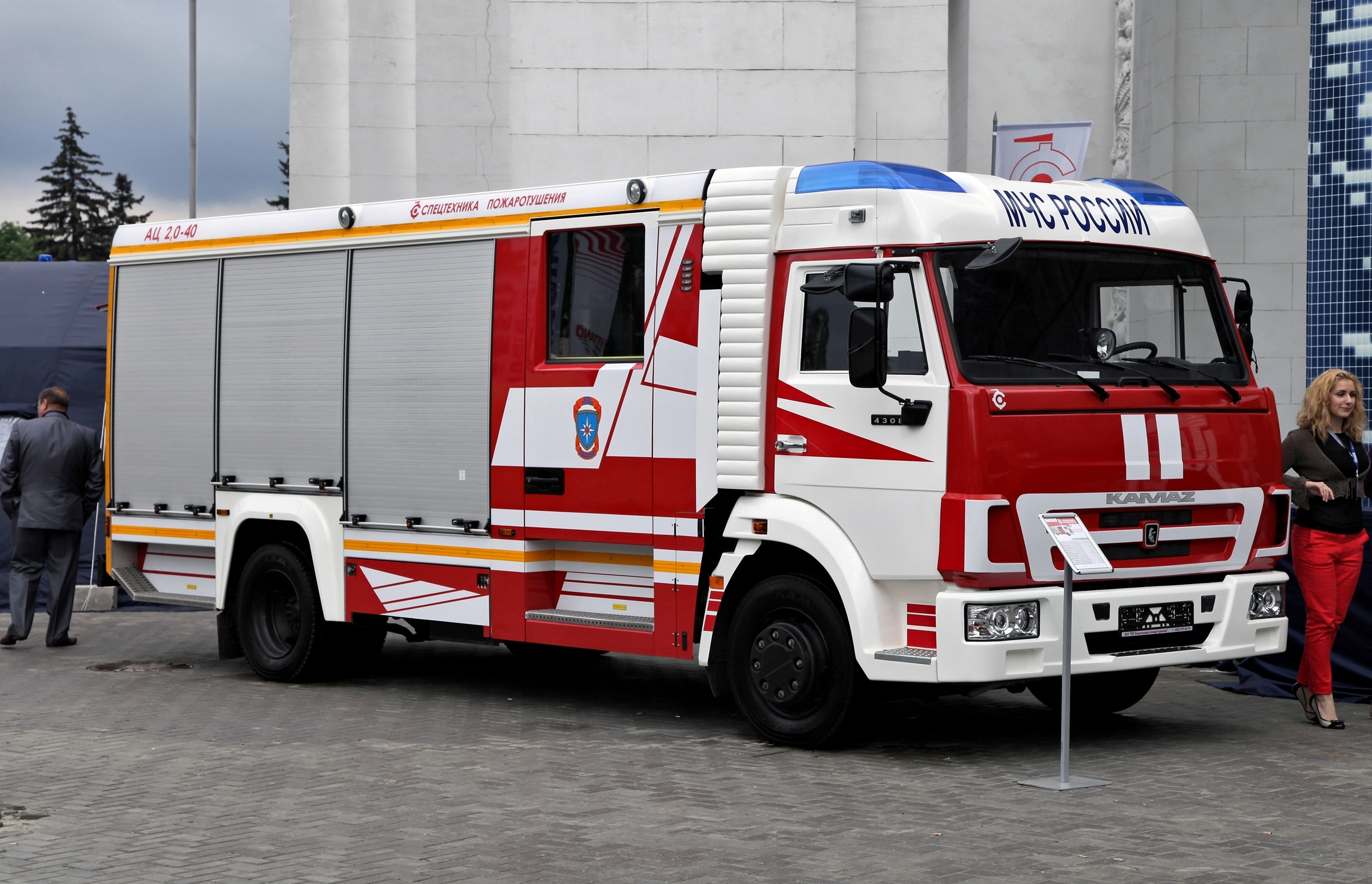
AC-2,0-40 on KamAZ-4308 chassis

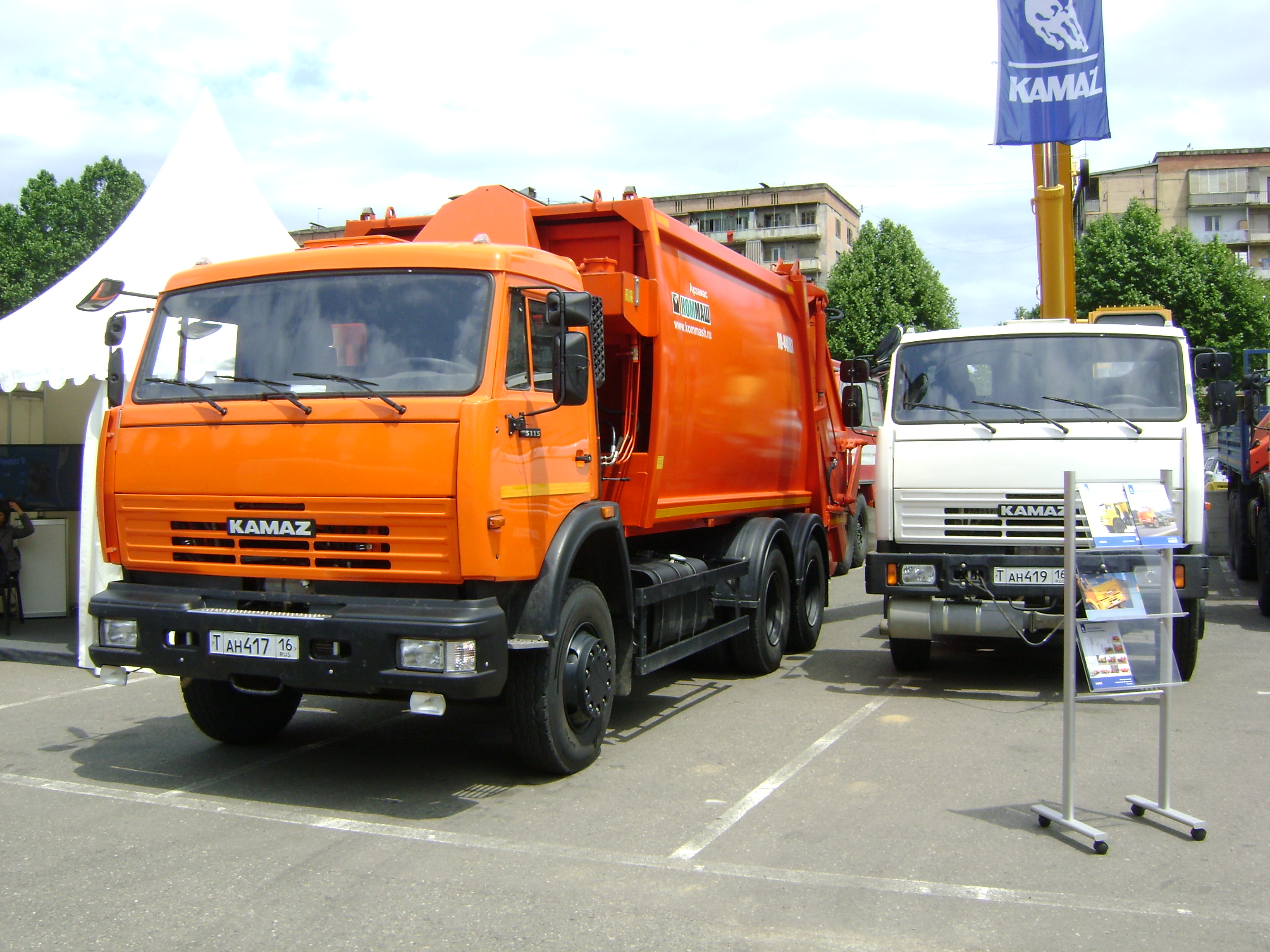
KamAZ-65115 garbage truck on "Caucasus Build" exhibition in Georgia

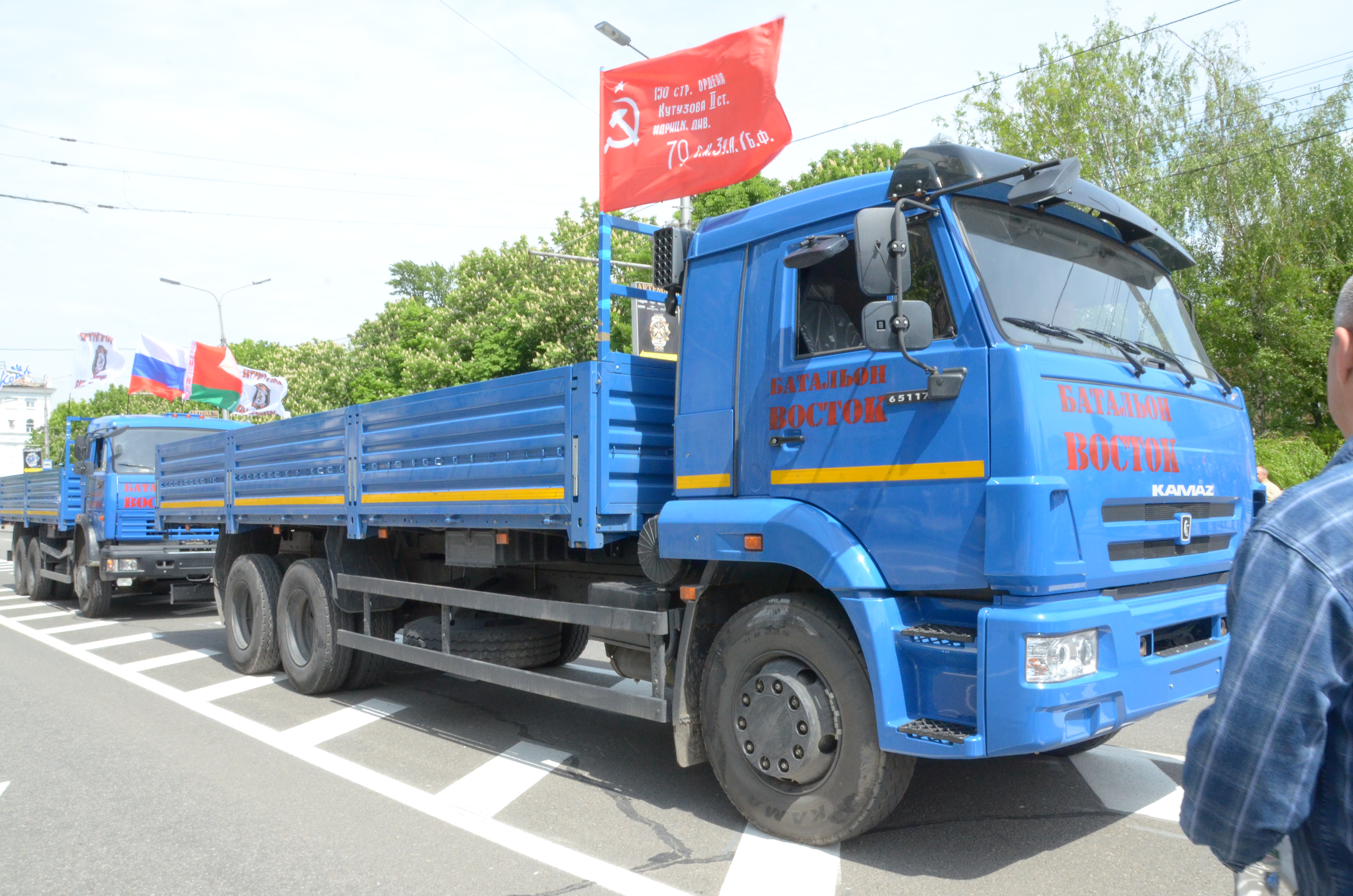
KamAZ-65117 in Donetsk, Ukraine

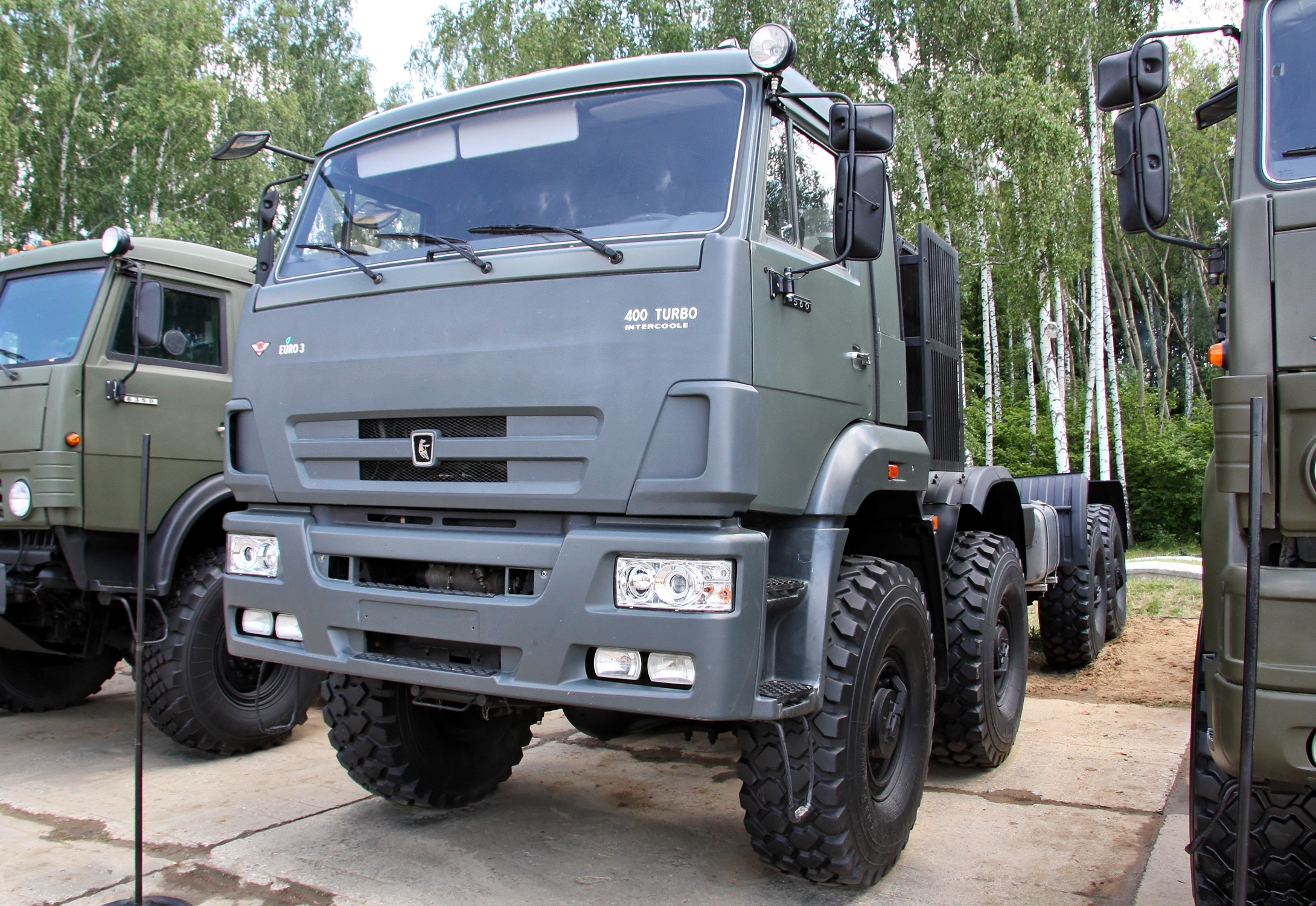
KamAZ-6560

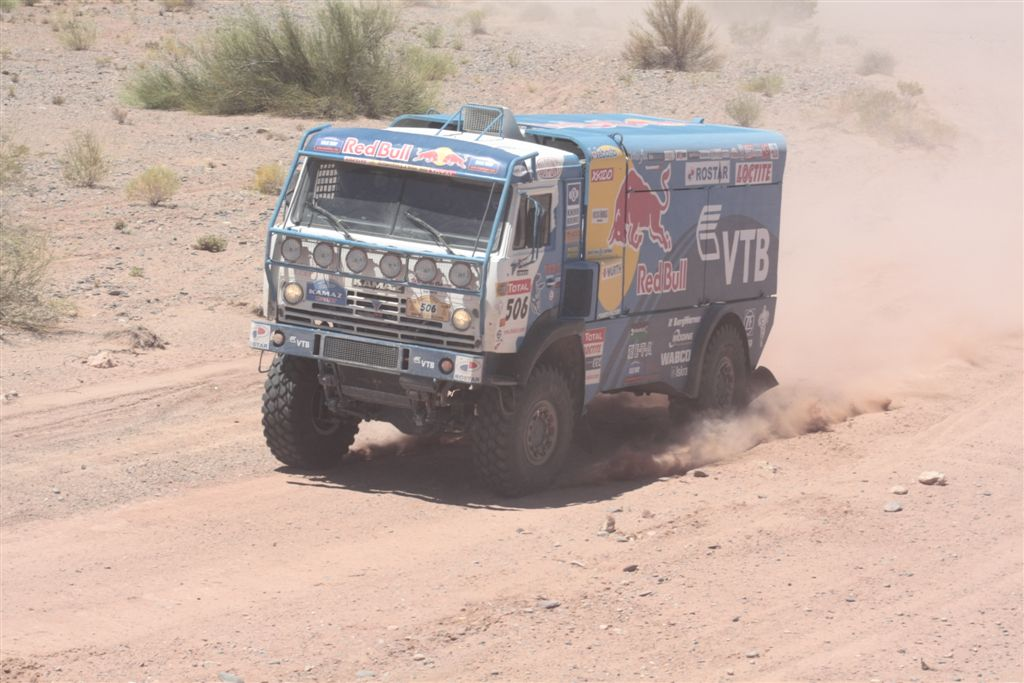
KamAZ Dakar Rally
