= KamAZ-5350 =

Russian military truck

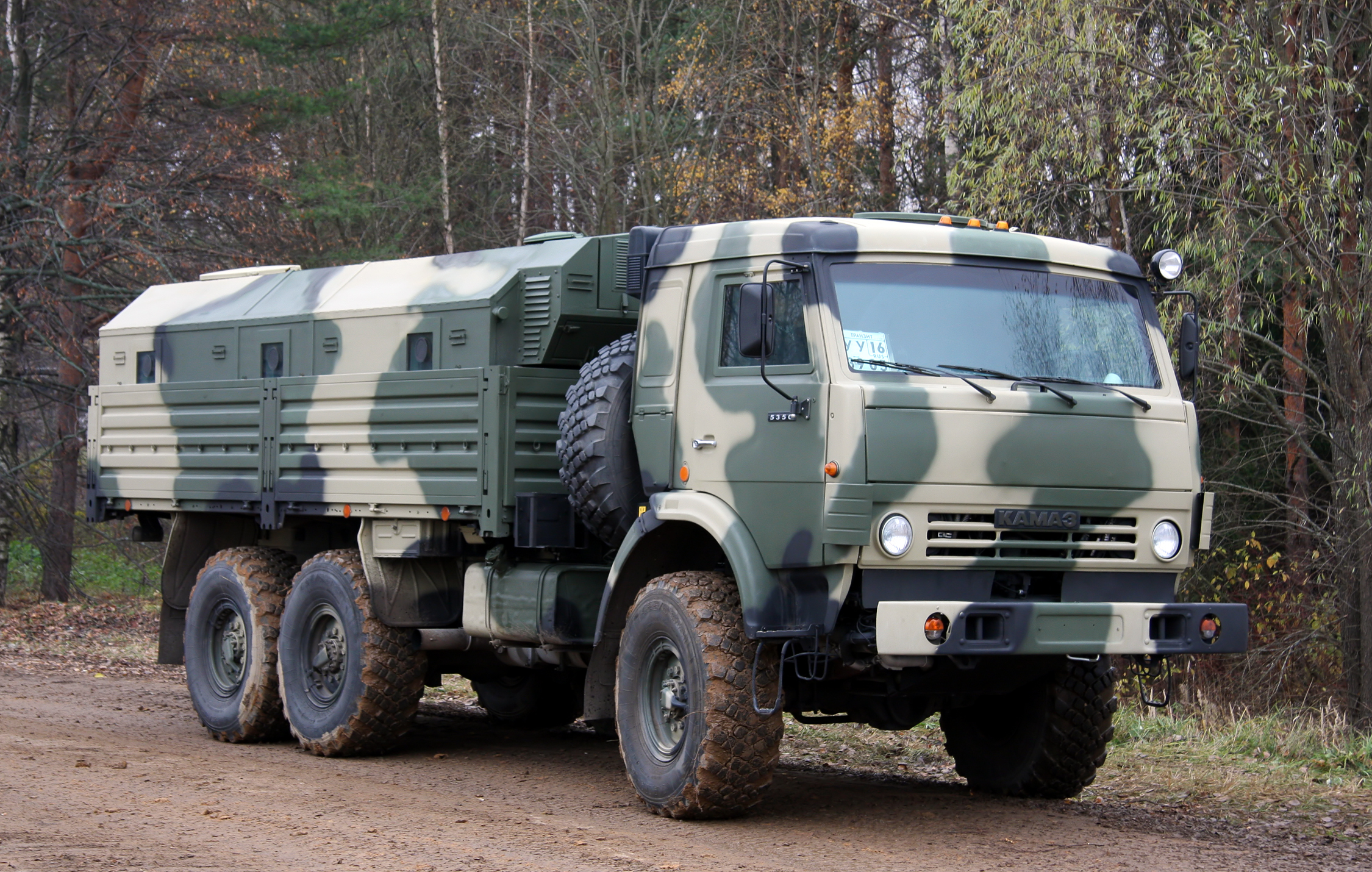
- KamAZ-5350 with an armoured compartment fitted

Overview
- Type: General utility truck
- Manufacturer: Kamaz
- Production: 2003–present
- Assembly: Naberezhnye Chelny, Russia

Body and chassis
- Class: Rough terrain truck
- Layout: All-wheel drive

Powertrain
- Electric motor: eight-cylinder diesel engine
- Power output: 191 - 206 kW

Dimensions
- Curb weight: 6 - 7,3 tonnes

Chronology
- Predecessor: KamAZ-43118 (indirectly)
- Successor: KamAZ-53501

The KamAZ-5350 (Russian: КамАЗ-5350), also known as "Mustang" (Russian: Мустанг) is a six-wheel drive truck produced by Kamaz in Naberezhnye Chelny. The vehicle has been in production since 2003 and is also designed for military applications. With the KamAZ-53501, there is a version with a slightly lower payload.

Besides the KamAZ-5350 with its three axles, there is also the KamAZ-4350 with two axles and the KamAZ-6350 with four axles. These vehicles are all part of the "Mustang" family of vehicles, sharing the same cabin and basic chassis design.

== History ==
The general utility truck is a development of the older KamAZ-4310, which has been used since the early 1980s. It was officially accepted into military service with the Russian Ground Forces in 2002. In 2003, small-scale production of the truck started.

The standard KamAZ-5350 has a payload capacity of 6,000 kg and has the ability to tow trailers or artillery pieces. Different modules have been designed to be fitted to the truck for different purposes. Additional armor can be fitted to the cabin to increase protection for the crew inside. The cabin can seat three people and has a sleeping berth.

The vehicle is powered by a KamAZ-740.13.260 turbocharged diesel engine, providing 250 horsepower. It is equipped with a cold weather starting device which is effective at temperatures down to -50 °C. The truck is fitted with a central tyre inflation system.

== Variants ==
- KamAZ-53501: A lengthened variant of the standard model with a larger payload capacity of 10,000 kg fitting different modules.
- KamAZ-53502: Rear-wheel drive tractor unit for military use. Manufactured since 2007.
- KamAZ-53503: Flatbed truck for military use. Manufactured since 2007
- KamAZ-53504: Four-wheel drive tractor unit for military use. Manufactured since 2004.
- KamAZ-53505: Rear-wheel drive dump truck for military use. Manufactured since 2007.
- KamAZ-5350 with loading crane: Flatbed variant with a crane, decreasing the carrying capacity.
- 1I39: Special vehicle with the equipment for cleaning gunbarrels of main battle tanks and other combat vehicles.
- ATZ-7-5350: Tank truck with a capacity of 7000 liters of fuel.
- SBA-60K2 Bulat: Wheeled armoured personnel carrier based on the chassis of the KamAZ-5350.
- 2B26: A 122mm multiple rocket launcher system on the basis of a KamAZ-5350 truck, also known as Grad-K.

== Operational history ==
The KamAZ-5350-379 was used by Russian forces in an armoured personnel carrier role in Syria. One of the variants used was fitted with the MM-501 modular armoured compartment for passengers with eight firing ports and two roof hatches.

Various KamAZ 5350 variants have been used in the Russian invasion of Ukraine. As of the 25th of June 2024, Russian forces have lost at least:

- KamAZ-5350 with EOV-3523 excavator: 18 destroyed, 3 captured
- KamAZ-5350 with KS-45719-7M crane: 5 destroyed, 1 damaged, 2 captured
- KamAZ-5350 with armoured cabin: 9 destroyed, 2 damaged, 6 captured
- 2B26 Grad-K: 4 destroyed, 1 damaged
