= KamAZ-43114 =

Russian all-wheel drive truck

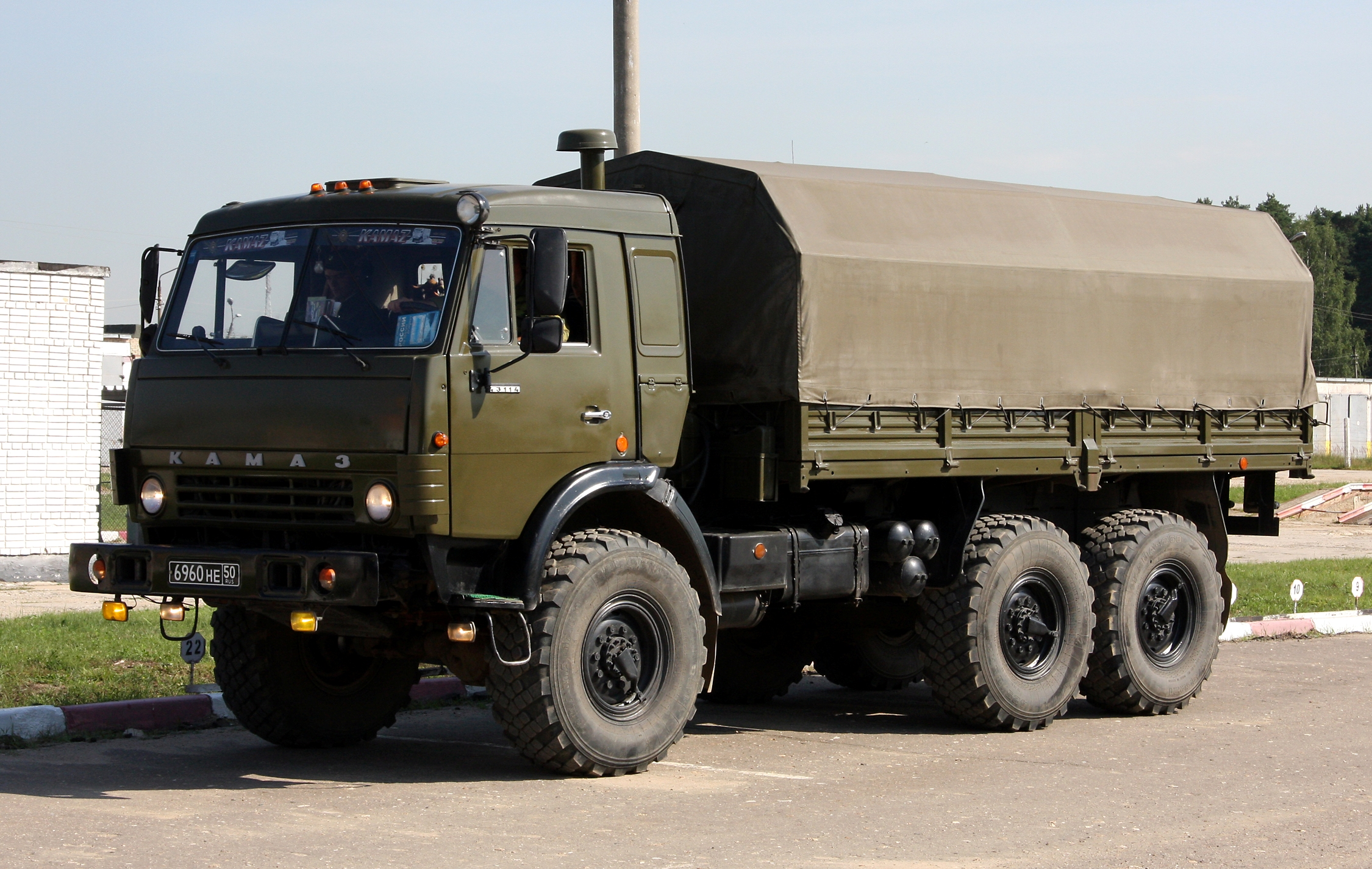

Overview
- Manufacturer: Kamaz
- Production: 1995–present
- Assembly: Naberezhnye Chelny, Russia

Body and chassis
- Class: truck
- Layout: All-wheel drive

Dimensions
- Wheelbase: 3,340 + 1,320 mm (131 + 52 in)
- Length: 7,960 mm (313 in)
- Width: 2,500 mm (98 in)
- Height: 2,945 mm (116 in)

Chronology
- Predecessor: KamAZ-4310
- Successor: KamAZ-43118

The KamAZ-43114 (Russian: КамАЗ-43114) is an all-wheel drive truck produced by Kamaz in Naberezhnye Chelny. The vehicle was developed from 1991 and has been in series production since 1995. The main difference between the model and its predecessor, the KamAZ-4310, is a more powerful engine.

== History ==
The development of the KamAZ-43114 from its predecessor, the KamAZ-4310, began back in 1991, and serial production began in 1995. The engine output was increased from 220 to 240 HP without changing the basic data such as displacement or number of cylinders. As with the modernized KamAZ-43101, the payload remained at six tons. A model with five tons of payload was no longer offered. However, the curb weight increased by almost a ton at the same time.

Since 2008, production of the KamAZ-43114 has been scaled down more and more in favor of the KamAZ-5350, a similar off-road truck. As of mid-2016, only the direct successor with a higher payload, the KamAZ-43118, is still available for civil customers.

== Variants ==
In the course of the more than 20 years of production, various versions of the KamAZ-43114 were built in series. The following list does not claim to be complete.

- KamAZ-43114 - basic version, built since 1995.
- KamAZ-43115 - version with a payload of seven tons,
- TZ-7-43114 - Tanker truck for aircraft fuel, 7000 L capacity.
- NefAZ-4208 - Instead of a loading area, this truck has a body for transporting people, with the driver's cab being retained as standard. Also built as a combination bus with a shorter loading area and compartment for passenger transport.
- AP-2 (43114) - fire engine based on the KamAZ-43114. There are various other fire engines based on this vehicle.
- ARS-14K and ARS-14 km - Mobile filling station.

The KamAZ-4326 is a very similar vehicle, but it only has two axles.

== Gallery ==
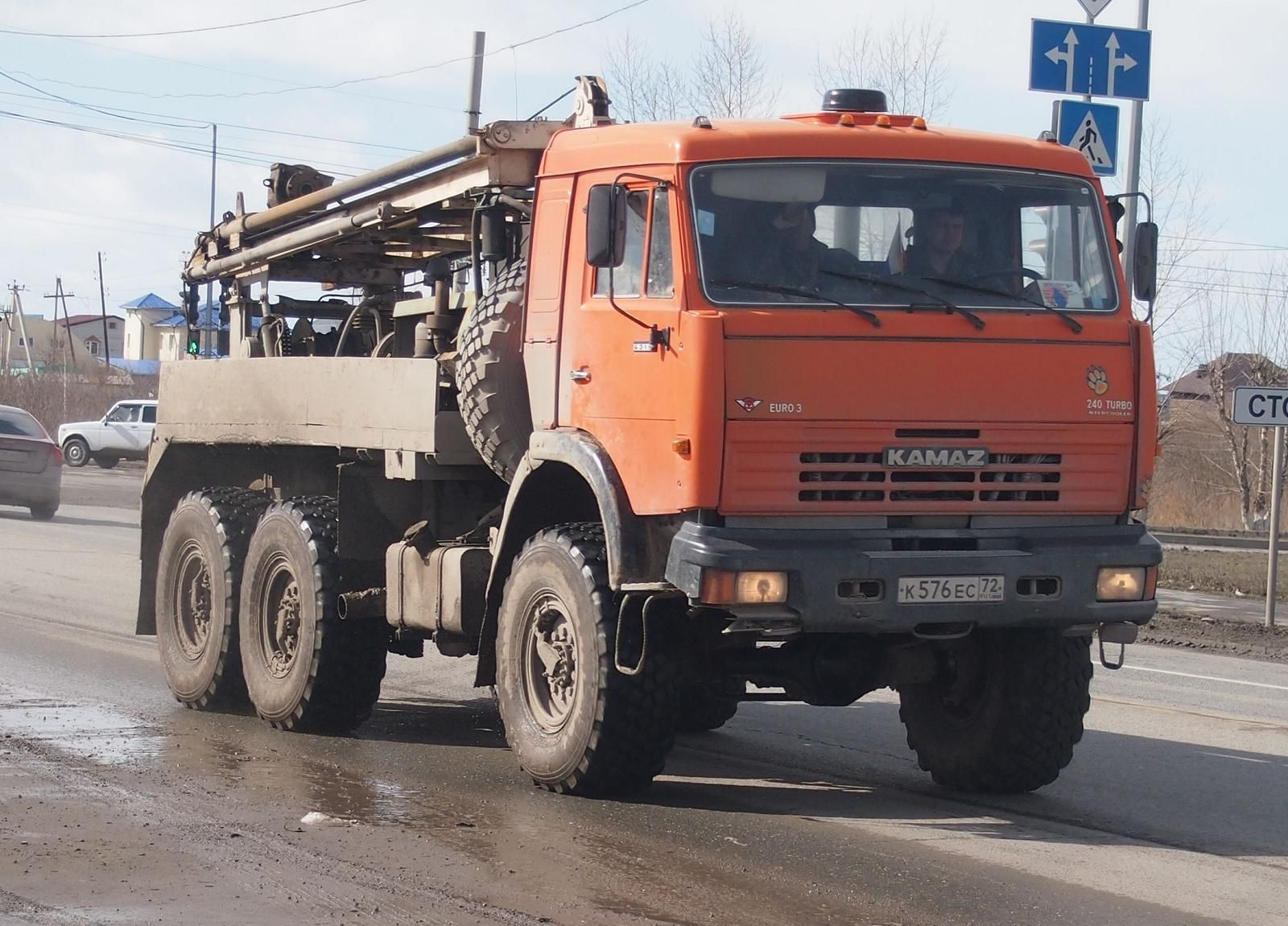
KamAZ-43114 with a PBU-2 drill rig in Tyumen (2014)

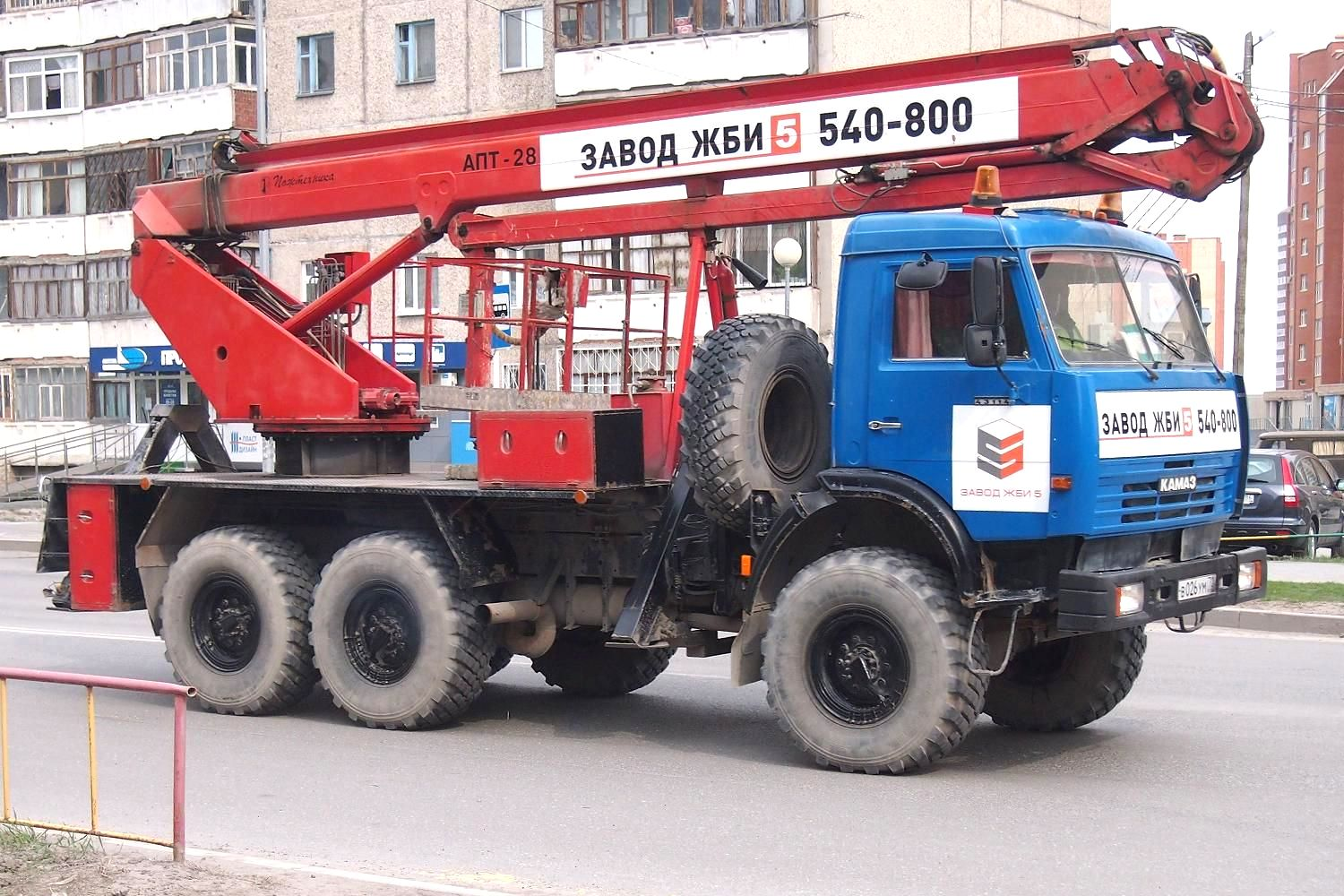
KamAZ-43114 with APT-28 lift in Tyumen (2014)

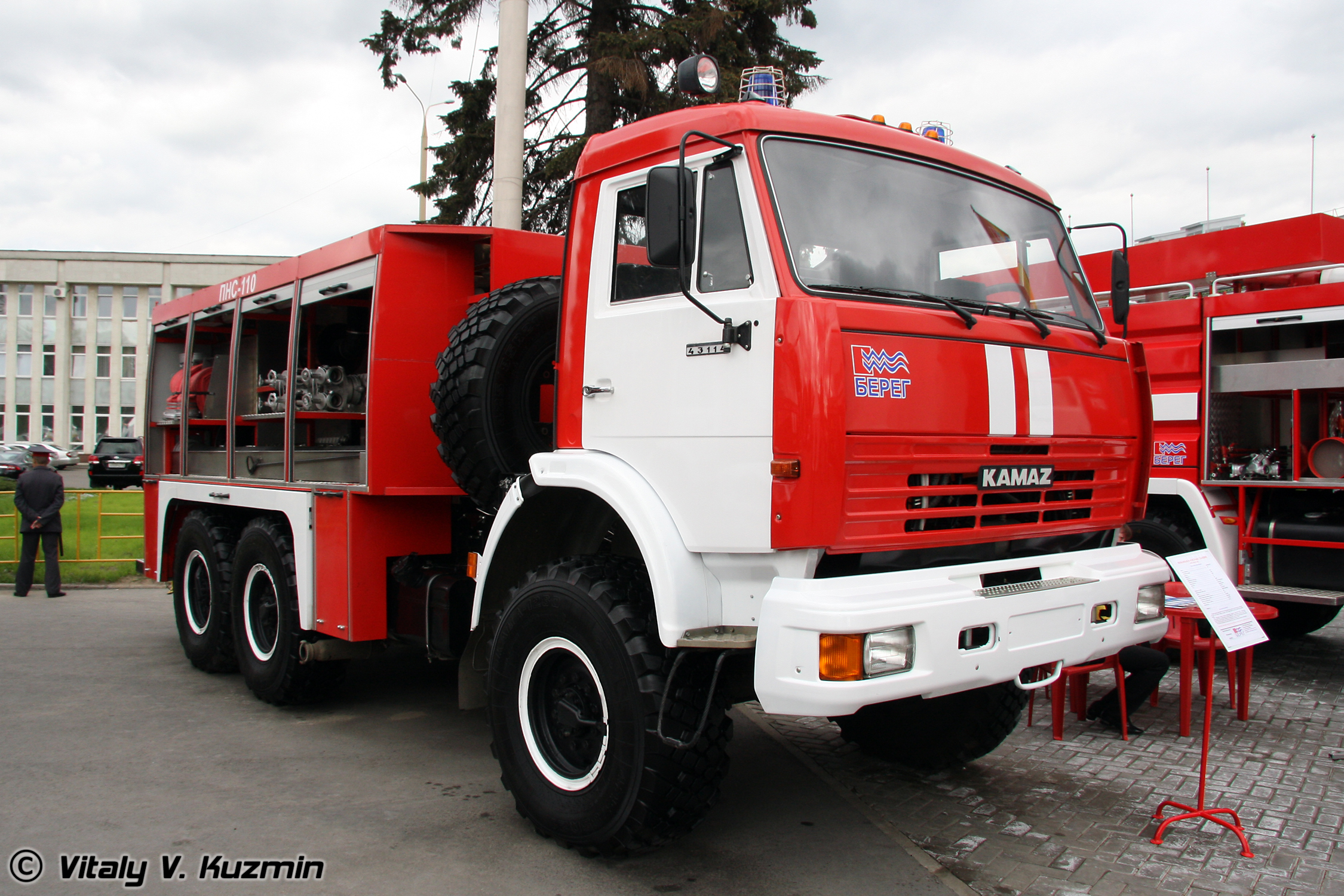
Fire engine PNS-110 based on a KamAZ-43114 (2009)

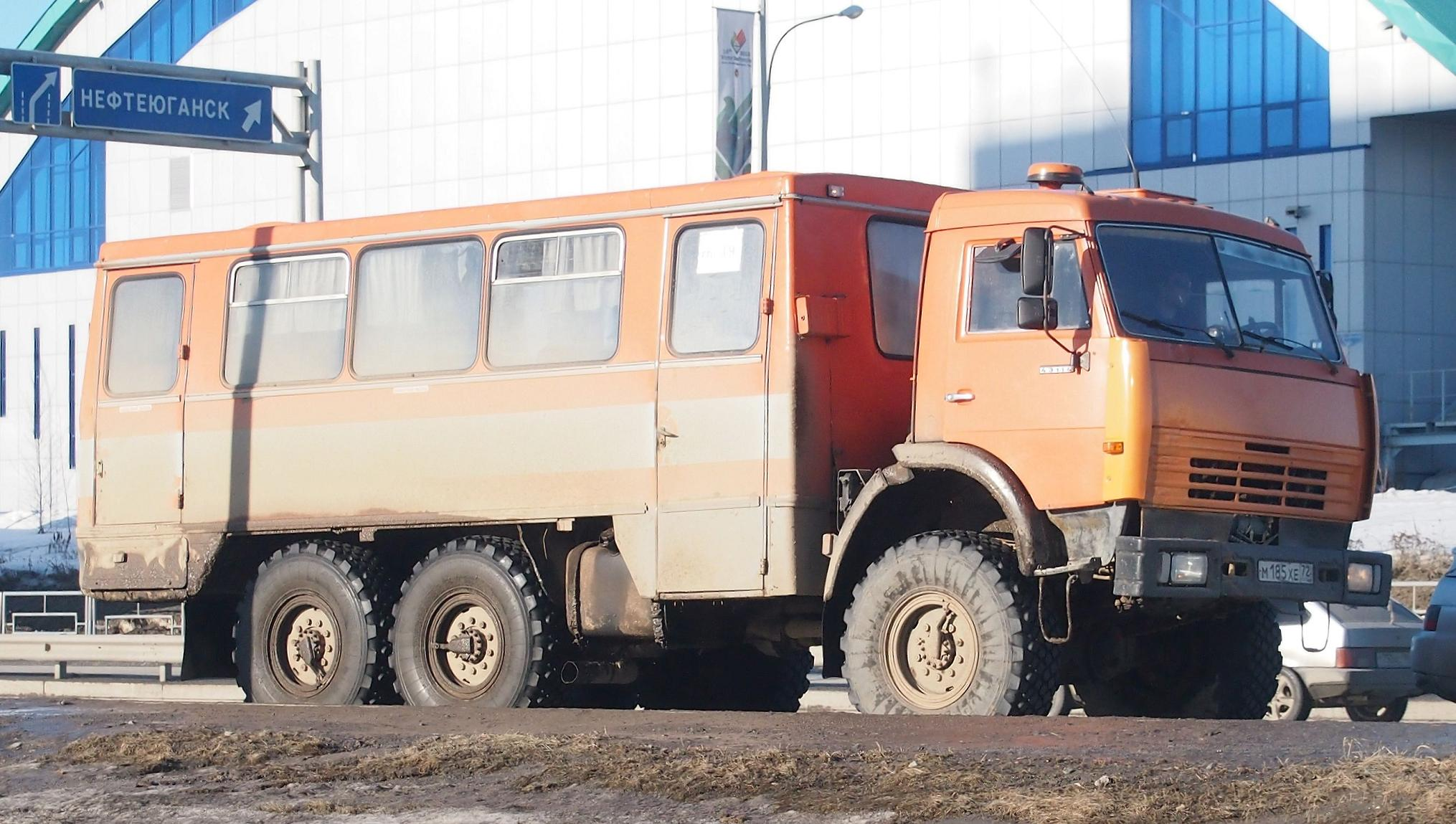
NefAZ-4208 for passenger transport based on the KamAZ-43114 in Khanty-Mansiysk (2015)
