= KamAZ-43118 =

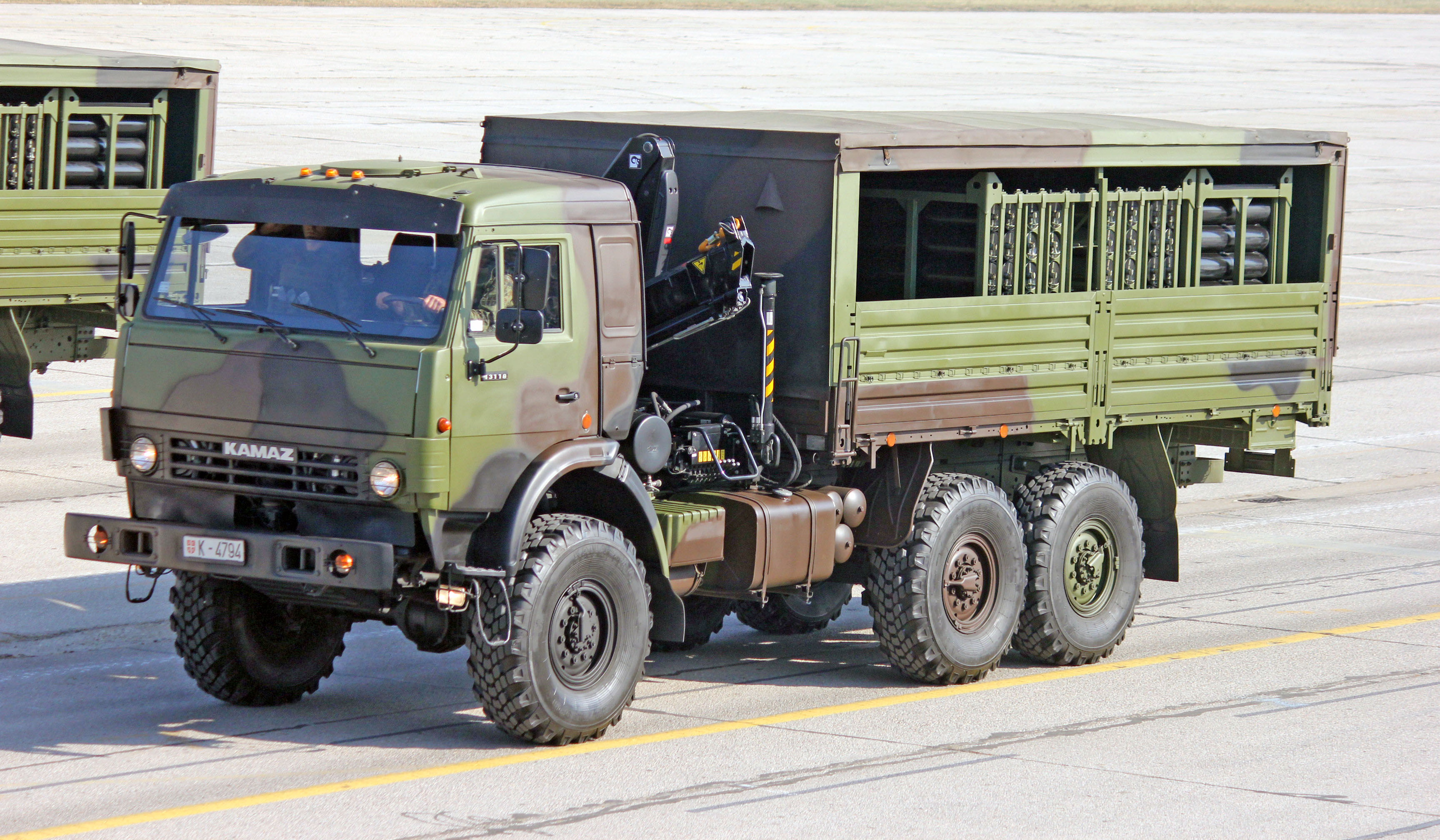
- Serbian Army KamAZ-43118

Overview
- Manufacturer: KamAZ
- Production: 1995–present

Body and chassis
- Class: Heavy
- Layout: 6×6
- Platform: Cargo
- Chassis: 43118-3027-50

Powertrain
- Engine: KAMAZ-740.30-260 (Euro-2)
- Transmission: mechanical, ten-speed

Dimensions
- Curb weight: 10200kg

Chronology
- Predecessor: KamAZ-43114

The KamAZ-43118 is a 6×6 all-wheel drive truck, developed by KamAZ, from the basis of the KamAZ-4310. The vehicle was introduced in 1995, as a successor to both the 4310 and the 43114.

== History ==
The truck was developed from the KamAZ-4410, as a more efficient body capable of cross-country travel. In 1997, production of this model began.

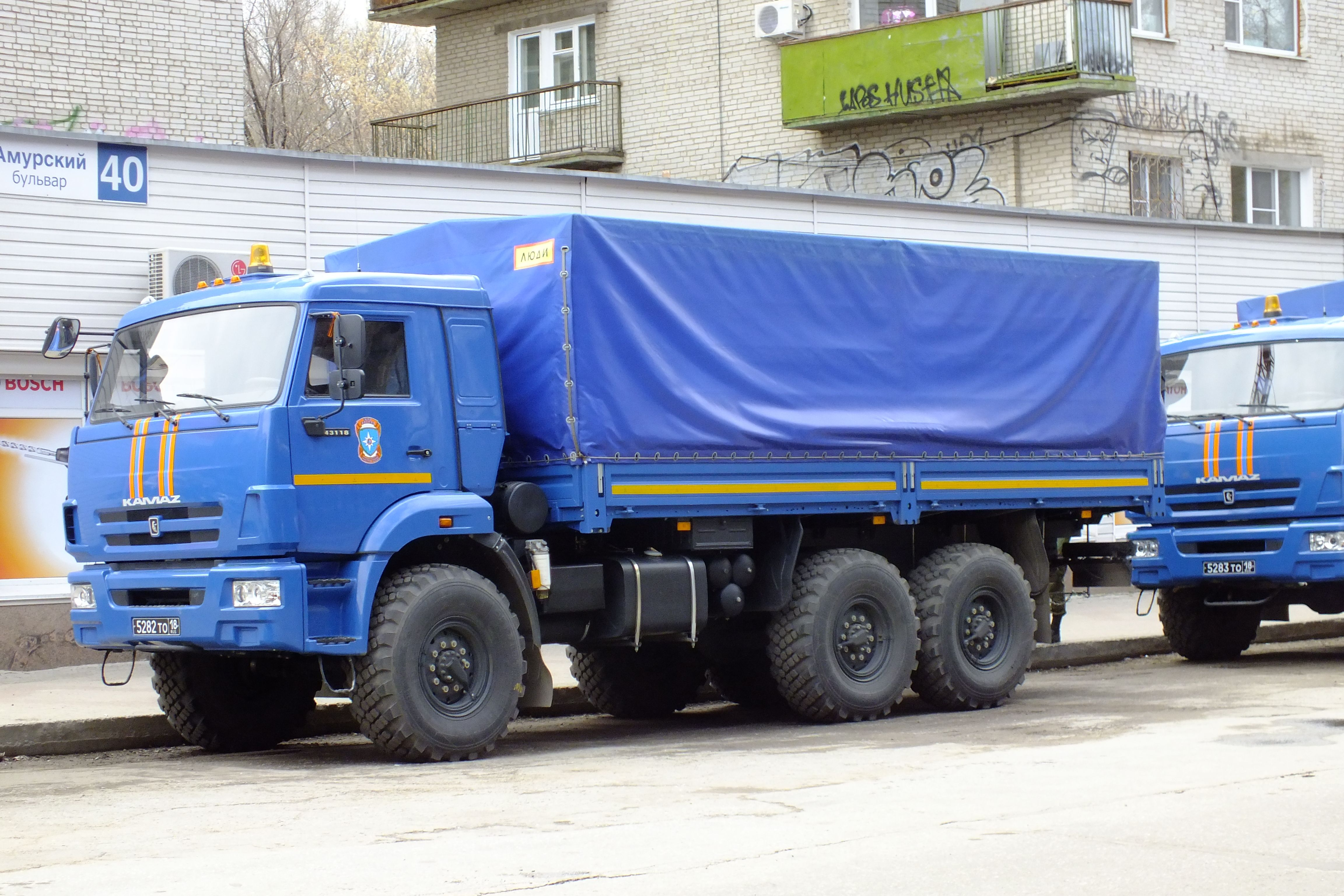
A Ministry of Emergency Situations of Russia's KamAZ-43118 utility truck with restyled cabin.

According to the manufacturer, KamAZ, it is the most popular model of truck from them over a period of several years.

== Specifications ==
- Wheel formula - 6×6
- Weight parameters and loads, a/m
  - Curb weight a / m, kg - 10400
  - Carrying capacity of a / m, kg - 10000
  - Gross weight, kg - 20700
- Engine
  - Model - KAMAZ-740.30-260 (Euro-2)
  - Type - diesel turbocharged
  - Power kW (hp) - 191 (260)
  - Location and number of cylinders - V-shaped, 8
  - Working volume, l - 10.85
- Transmission
  - Type - mechanical, ten-speed
- Cabin
  - Type - located above the engine, with a high roof
  - Execution - with a berth
- Wheels and tires
  - Wheel type - disc
  - Tire type - pneumatic, chamber
  - Tire size - 425/85 R21 (1260x425-533P)
- Platform
  - Platform onboard, with metal folding sides
  - Internal dimensions, mm - 6100x2320
  - Board height, mm - 500
- General characteristics
  - Maximum speed, km/h - 90
  - Angle overcome. lifting, % not less than — 60 (31º)
  - External overall turning radius, m — 11.5
