= KamAZ-4310 =

Russian all-wheel drive truck

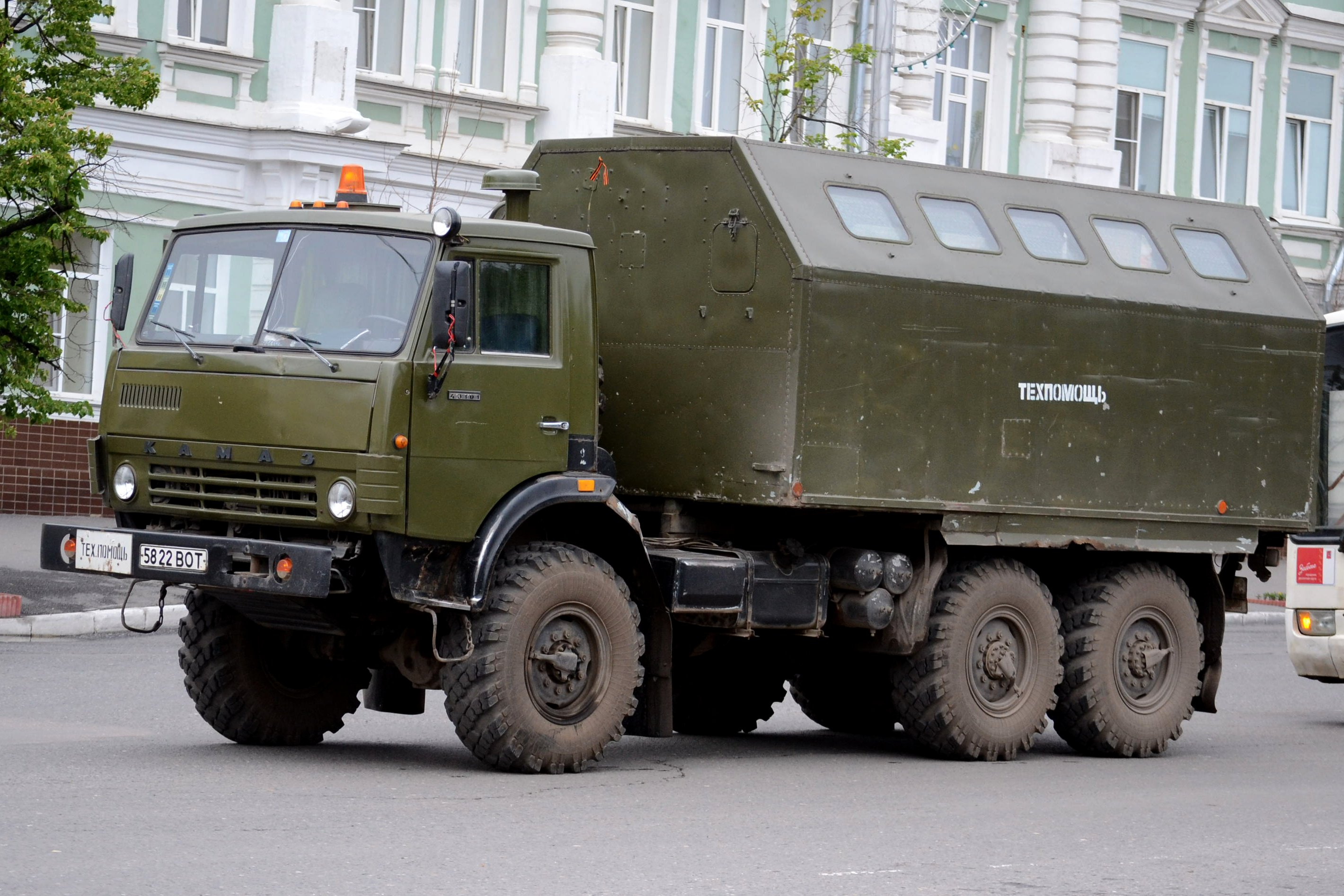

Overview
- Manufacturer: Kamaz
- Production: 1981–1995
- Assembly: Naberezhnye Chelny, Russia

Body and chassis
- Class: Truck
- Layout: All-wheel drive

Dimensions
- Wheelbase: 3,340 + 1,320 mm (131 + 52 in)
- Length: 7,895 mm (311 in)
- Width: 2,500 mm (98 in)
- Height: 3,200 mm (126 in)

Chronology
- Successor: KamAZ-43114

The KamAZ-4310 (Russian: КамАЗ-4310) is an all-wheel drive truck produced by Kamaz in Naberezhnye Chelny. The vehicle was built in series in different versions from 1981 to 1995, a very similar successor is still on the market today with the KamAZ-43114, also in different versions.

== History ==
As early as 1971, ten years before the start of large-scale production, the plant presented its first prototype under the name KamAZ-4310. It already had all the essential features that the series model later had: single tires on all axles, permanent all-wheel drive, a tilting driver's cab and the KamAZ-740 engine.

In 1972 pre-series production began, which resulted in a total of four different types. They differed only insignificantly in structure and were all manufactured until 1978.

In 1981, serial production of the KamAZ-4310 model finally began. Like all previous types, it had only minor changes compared to the original version from 1971 and was very similar in construction to the KamAZ-5320 without all-wheel drive. The main difference was the payload, which increased by one ton to six tons compared to all previous versions. Production continued until 1989. [2] This year the vehicle was revised and received a more powerful version of the KamAZ 740 engine with now 220 hp. Engines with 210 hp had previously been installed. Production was stopped in 1995 in favor of the modernized successor, the KamAZ-43114.

In 1987, vehicles of this type came to East Germany to be used by the National People's Army. In particular, these were tank vehicles and box vehicles with special bodies. In addition, VEB Maschinenbau Karl Marx Babelsberg built a total of 17 vehicles of the type 100 car slewing crane with a lifting force of ten tons in 1989 and 1990, using the chassis of the KamAZ-43105.

== Variants ==
In the following, the versions are listed that were created in the course of the various production stages.

- KamAZ-4310 prototype - prototype from 1971.
- KamAZ-4310 pre-production model - built from 1972 to 1978, only the rear drop side is foldable.
- KamAZ-43101 - pre-production model, built from 1972 to 1978, all side walls are foldable.
- KamAZ-43102 - pre-production model, built from 1972 to 1978, with an extended cabin and sleeping space.
- KamAZ-43103 - pre-production model, built from 1972 to 1978, with a long cabin and open loading area.
- KamAZ-4310 production model - built from 1981 to 1989, six tons payload, basic model.
- KamAZ-43105 - built from 1981 to 1989, equipped with a winch and extended flatbed, seven tons payload.
- KamAZ-43101 - modernized version, built from 1989 to 1995, payload six tons.
- KamAZ-43106 - modernized version, built from 1989 to 1995, payload seven tons.

== Gallery ==
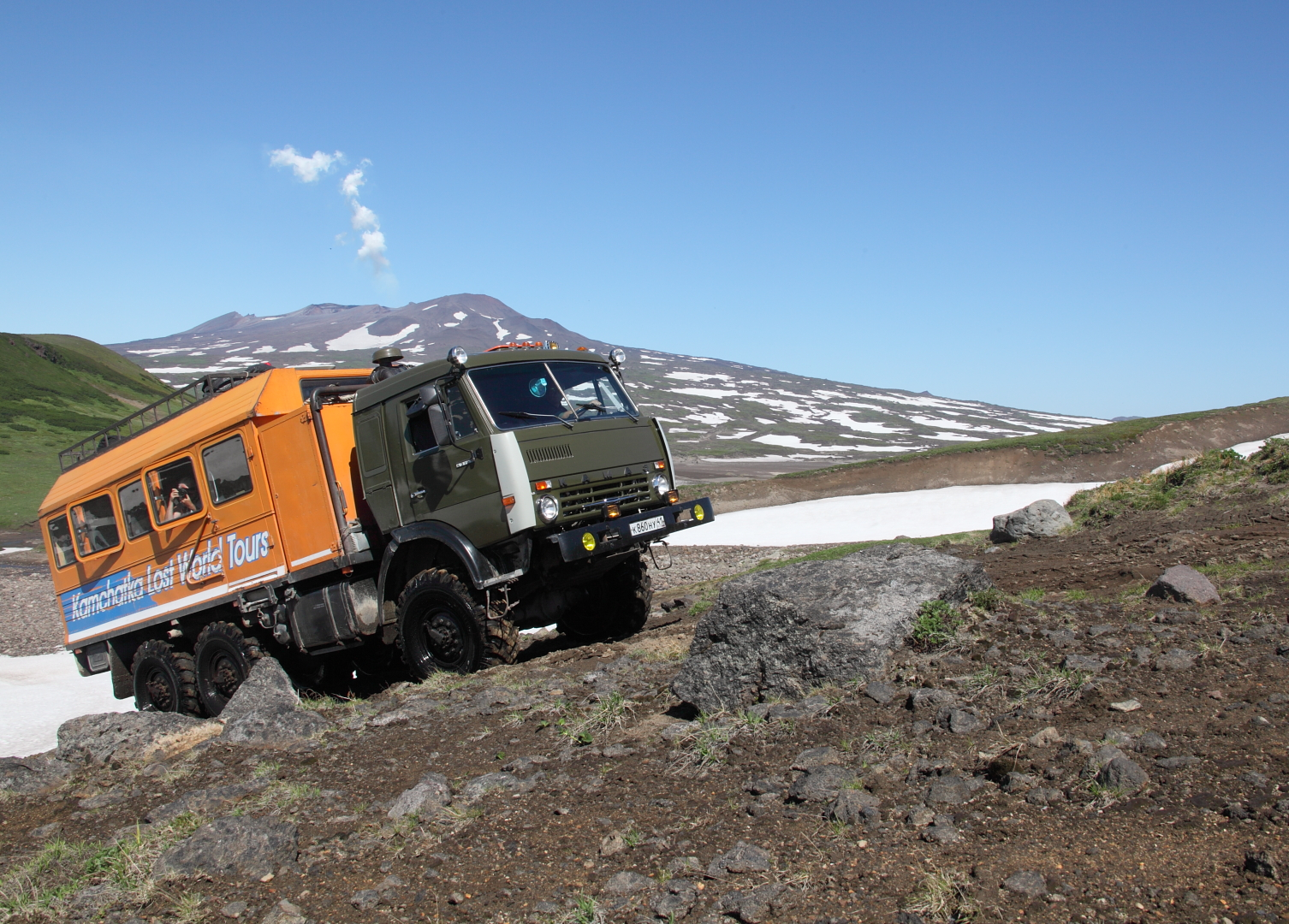
KamAZ-43105 on Kamchatka in the field (2010)

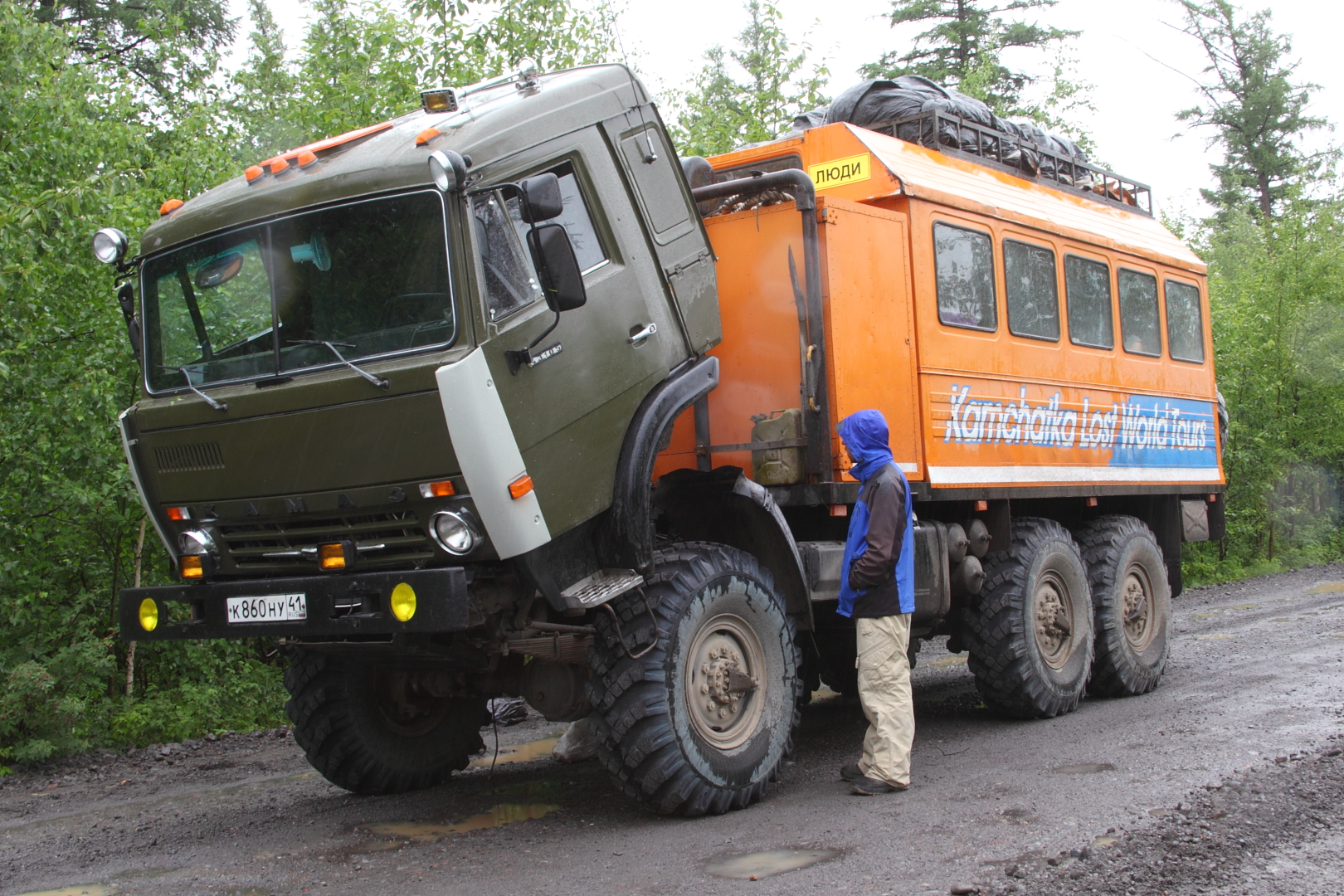
The same vehicle with the cabin folded up

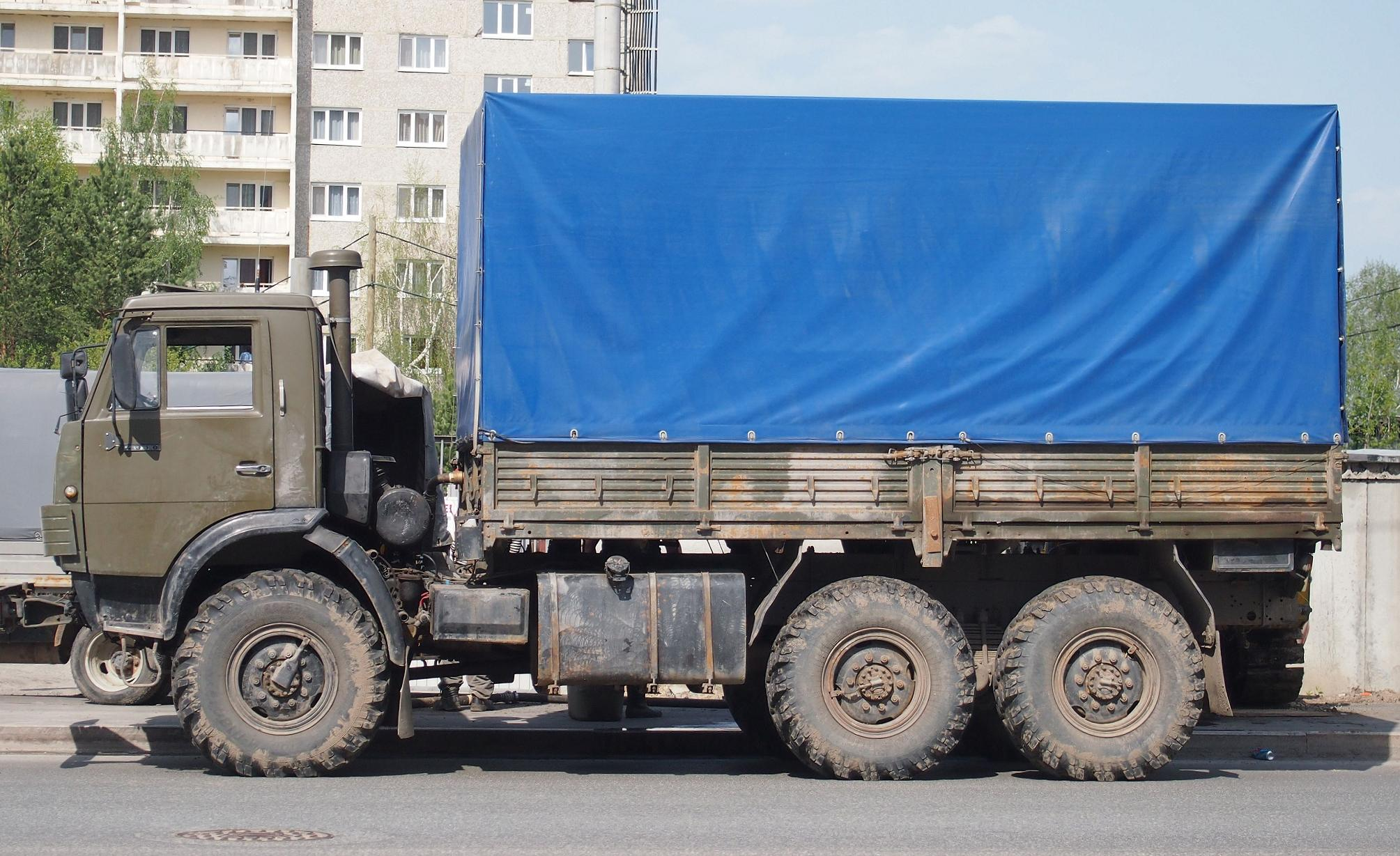
KamAZ-4310 in Tyumen (2014)

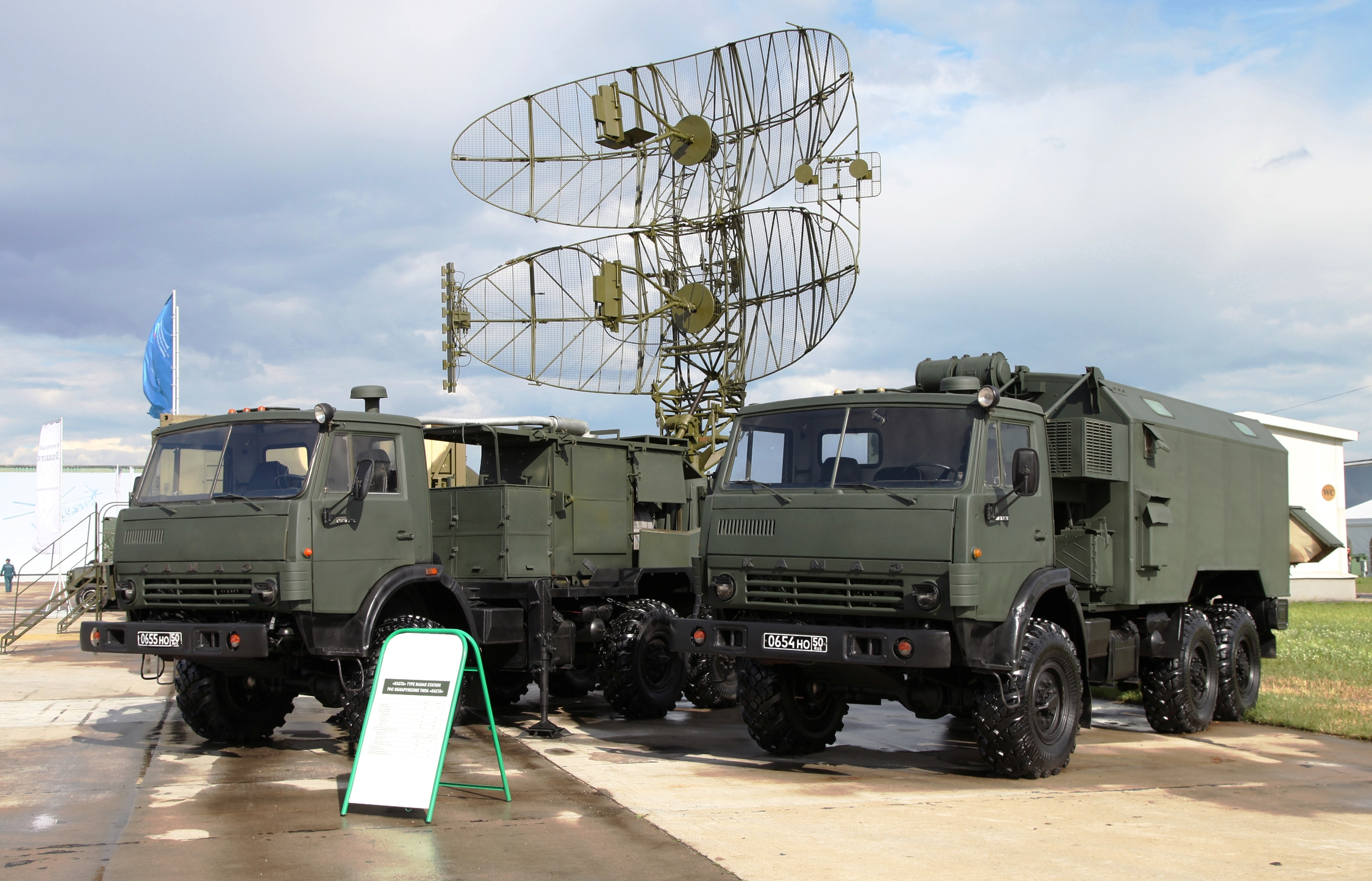
Military radar system on KamAZ-4310 (2012)
