= Russian State Fire Service =

National fire service in Russia

- Государственная противопожарная служба

Operational area
- Country: Russia
- City: Moscow

Agency overview
- Established: April 30, 1649, as Moscow Municipal Rescue
- Employees: 220,000 (approx)

Facilities and equipment
- Stations: 30,000 (approx)
- Trucks: 18,500 (approx)

Russian State Fire Service (Russian: Государственная противопожарная служба, romanized: Gosudarstvennaya protivopozharnaya sluzhba) is the highest fire service body of Russian Federation. A part of the Ministry of Emergency Situations since 2001, the State Fire Service is divided into the Federal Fire Service and the Fire Service of the Federal subjects of Russia.

The State Fire Service's 220,000 personnel operate out of 13,600 buildings and structures, including 4000 plus fire stations containing 18,634 fire apparatus and 49 fireboats.

State Fire Service divisions participate in over two million operations a year, rescue over 90,000 lives, save property evaluated as high as 120 billion Ruble.

The Institute for Fire Defense and Scientific Research and 70 special laboratories are responsible for the SFS scientific support, new technologies and methods of work.

== History ==
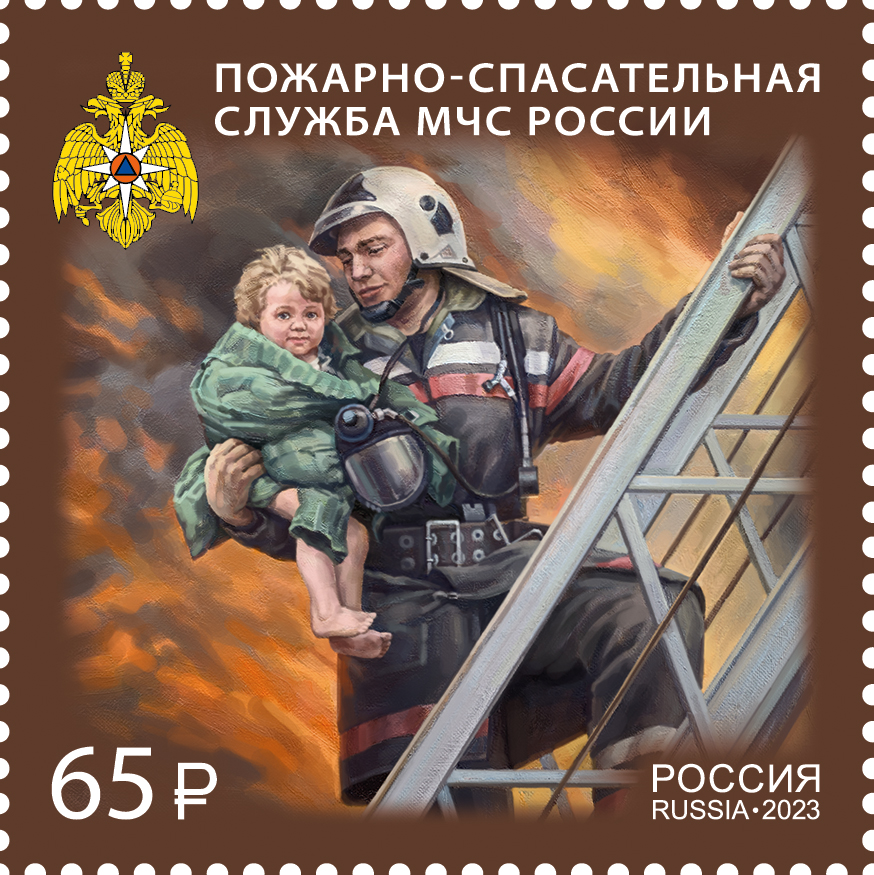
Russian Post stamp featuring the Fire Service

The first fire service in Russia was established by Czar Alexey Mikhailovich under signed decree named "Direction on Municipal rescue", which signed on April 30, 1649, in Moscow.

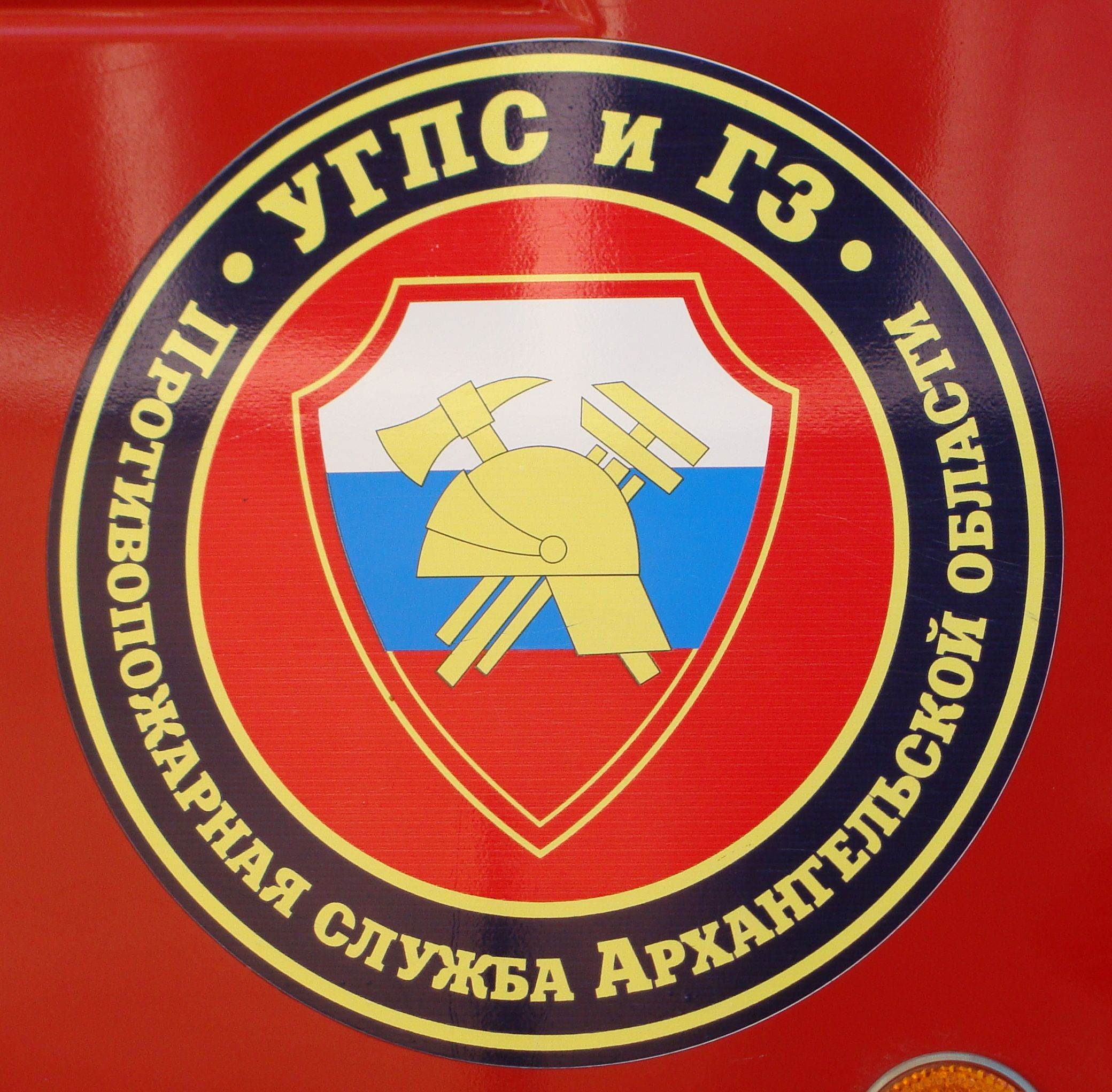
The emblem fire service of the Arkhangelsk region

Six months after the October Revolution, on April 17, 1918, Vladimir Lenin signed a decree on organisation of activities for firefighting, which was considered the birth date for the Soviet State Fire service. Up to 2001 the Fire Service was part of the Ministry of Internal Affairs of Russia.

By 1927, the heterogeneity in uniforms and insignia in the republics practically disappeared and the uniform of firefighters of the RSFSR came to be used as a model for introduction for a long time. Fire protection was provided by both professional and voluntary fire brigades (1927–1932), subordinate to the NKVD of the RSFSR.

In 1930, the militarization of the transport fire department was carried out, on the basis of which the militarized fire department of the People's Commissariat of Communication Routes of the Soviet Union of the USSR was created. The service life of paramilitary personnel was at least two years. At the end of 1930, the Main Directorate of Public Utilities and the Police Department were separated from the NKVD and transferred to the direct subordination of the Council of People's Commissars of the RSFSR. On March 4, 1931, the Council of People's Commissars of the RSFSR issues a document on the centralization of the republic's fire service. The departmental ones remained: the fire protection of the NKPS, the Navy and the People's Commissariat of Water Transport.

July 20, 1931, by resolution of the All-Russian Central Executive Committee and the Council of People's Commissars of the RSFSR, fire protection was transferred to the People's Commissariat of Public Utilities (NKKH). The Central Fire Department (TsPO) of the NKVD was transformed into the Central Fire Department (TsUPO) of the NKKH.

Between 1934 and 1946 the fire services were under the Main Directorate of Fire Security (Russian: главное управление пожарной охраны (ГУПО)) of the NKVD. Simultaneously with the transfer of the fire department to the jurisdiction of the NKKH, a militarized fire department is being organized under the OGPU to protect strategic facilities.

In 1934, the Main Fire Department was formed as part of the NKVD of the USSR. The City Fire Department was responsible for ensuring fire safety in populated areas, while the departmental fire department was responsible for enterprises and transport. To protect fire-hazardous and especially important industrial facilities and large administrative centers, the militarized Fire Protection Service of the NKVD was created.

In 1957, the Faculty of Fire Safety and Safety Engineers was opened at the Higher School of the Soviet Ministry of Internal Affairs. Fire testing stations were established in large cities.

Since 1958 the fire services became a member of the International Technical Committee for the Prevention and Extinction of Fire.

Since 1966, the management of fire protection was carried out by the General Directorate of Fire Protection (Russian: Главное управление пожарной охраны) in the Ministry of Internal Affairs of the USSR, which included the State Fire Supervision, which carried out work on the prevention of fires in buildings and structures under construction and in operation, as well as units of paramilitary fire protection and professional fire protection, which extinguished fires in cities, industrial and other objects of the national economy. Some ministries and departments such as the Ministry of Railways of the Soviet Union, the Ministry of Forestry and Glavneftesnab company had their own departmental fire protection.

Militarized fire protection was organized in cities that were the most important administrative centers of the USSR, as well as at industrial and other facilities of particular importance or increased fire and explosion hazard. Professional fire protection was created in cities, urban-type settlements, regional centers, as well as at national economic facilities.

Since 1965, units and divisions of the Moscow paramilitary fire department began to be staffed by persons called up for active military service.

In 1991, following the dissolution of the Soviet Union, the firefighting service became part of the successor to the Soviet MVD, the Ministry of Internal Affairs of the Russian Federation.

On December 21, 1994, the Federal Law "On Fire Safety" was adopted, which laid the foundations for a unified fire safety system.

On 17 April 1998 the decree "On the organization of state measures to combat fire" was issued and that date was considered as the unofficial professional holiday. In 1999 a presidential decree set the date on 30 April.

On April 30, 1999, Russian president Boris Yeltsin signed a directive that declared April 30 as the celebratory date for Fire Services in Russia, 350 years after their creation.

From 1 January 2002 in accordance with a presidential decree issued on 9 November 2001, the Fire Service was transferred from the Ministry of Internal Affairs to the Ministry of Emergencies with all 278,000 firefighters transferred after 84 years under the MVD.

== Forms of fire services in Russia ==
In Russia, there are 5 forms of Fire Services, established by Federal Law of the Russian Federation "About fire safety".

- State Fire Service
  - Federal Fire Service
  - Fire Service of the Federal subjects of Russia.
- Municipal Fire service
- Departmental Fire Service
- Private Fire Service
- Voluntary Fire Service

== Divisions of State Fire Service ==
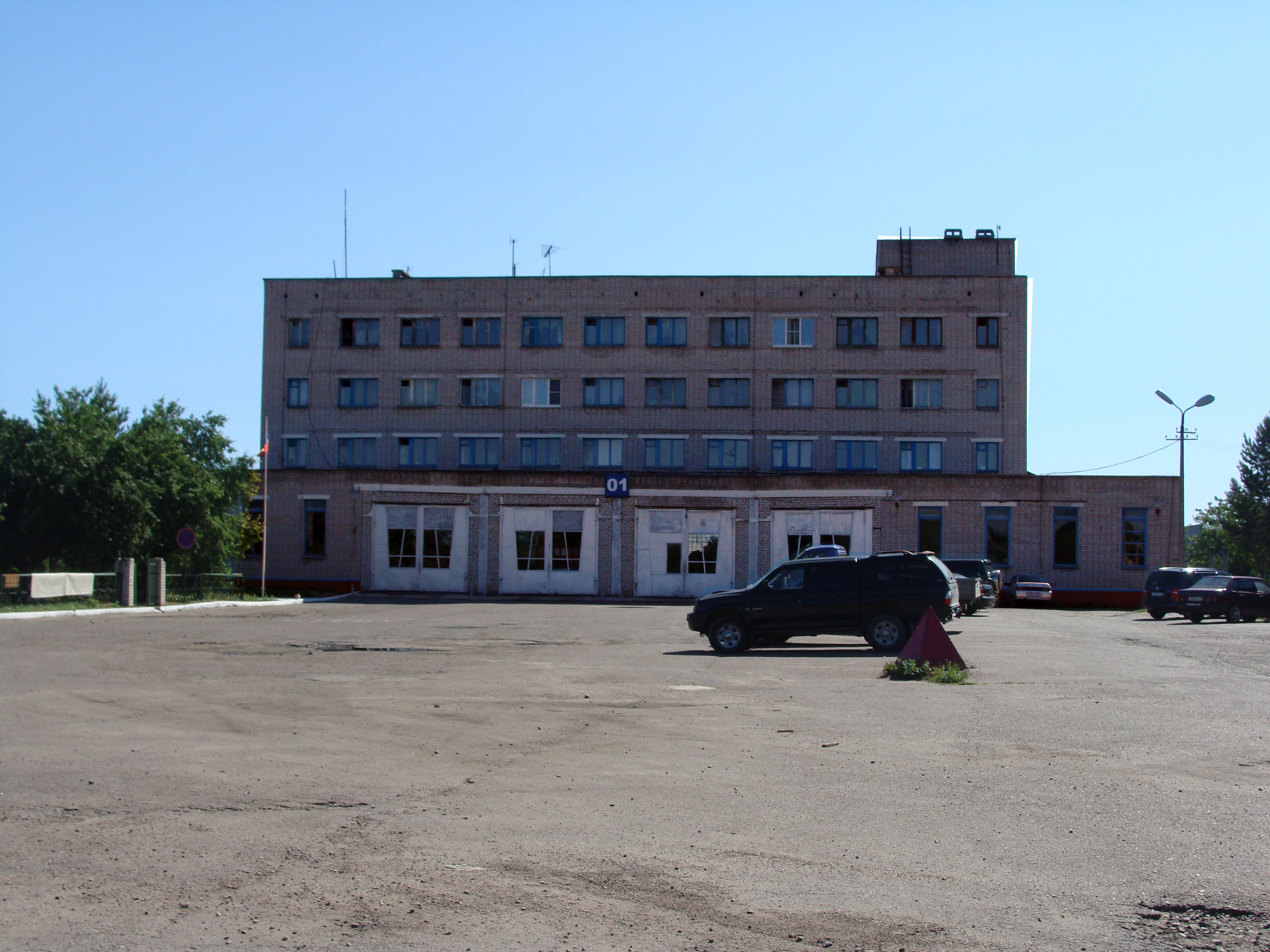
Moscow fire station.

=== Federal Fire Service ===
The Federal Fire Service (Russian: Федеральная противопожарная служба, Federalnaya protivopozharnaya sluzhba), is an integral part of the State Fire Service and is part of the Ministry of the Russian Federation for Civil Defense, Emergencies and Elimination of Consequences of Natural Disasters (Russian Ministry of Emergency Situations).

Its basic functions are:

- Conducts prevention, fire fighting and rescue work -
  - at facilities that are critical to the national security of the country, other important fire facilities, the most valuable objects of cultural heritage of the peoples of the Russian Federation, for the activities at the federal level with the massive concentration of people;
  - in closed administrative-territorial formations, as well as in important organizations and regime;
  - Supervises the implementation of the federal executive bodies, executive bodies of subjects of the Russian Federation, local self-government organizations and federal laws, technical regulations and other legal acts in the field of fire safety;
  - Exercises operational control of other types of fire protection forces and means involved to extinguish fires at facilities that are critical to the national security of the country, other important fire facilities, the most valuable objects of cultural heritage of the peoples of the Russian Federation, as well as for the activities of the federal level with the massive concentration of people;
  - Conducts monitoring of the state of fire safety in the Russian Federation is preparing proposals for government agencies and local governments to implement measures in the field of fire safety;
  - Conducts fire information and education of the public on fire safety measures;
  - Organizes and conducts official statistical records and state statistical reports on fires and their consequences on the territory of the Russian Federation, the performance of operational activities and resources of the Federal Fire Service, Fire Service of the Russian Federation and other types of fire protection;
  - Preparing draft legislation Russian Emergencies Ministry in the field of fire safety and organization of the Federal Fire Service

The treaty units of the Federal Fire Service are maintained by the protected objects. Buildings, structures, facilities, fire and other machinery, and equipment, gear and equipment transferred to the use of contractual unit FPS, are the property of the organization and remain on its balance sheet.

=== Fire Service of the Russian Federation ===
Financial support of the Fire Service of the Russian Federation is carried out by means of:

- the budget of the Russian Federation;
- funds allocated for the financing of regional programs in the field of fire safety;
- funds received in accordance with the existing agreements, including the provision of permitted fee-based services;
- contributions, donations and other sources not prohibited by law.

== Ranks ==
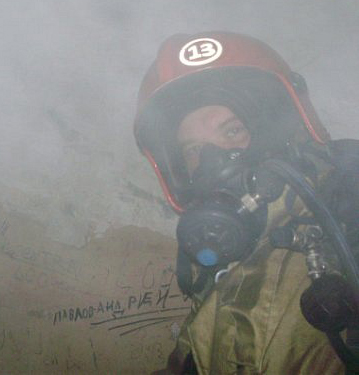
Russian Firefighter with a Head of duty shift fire station helmet.

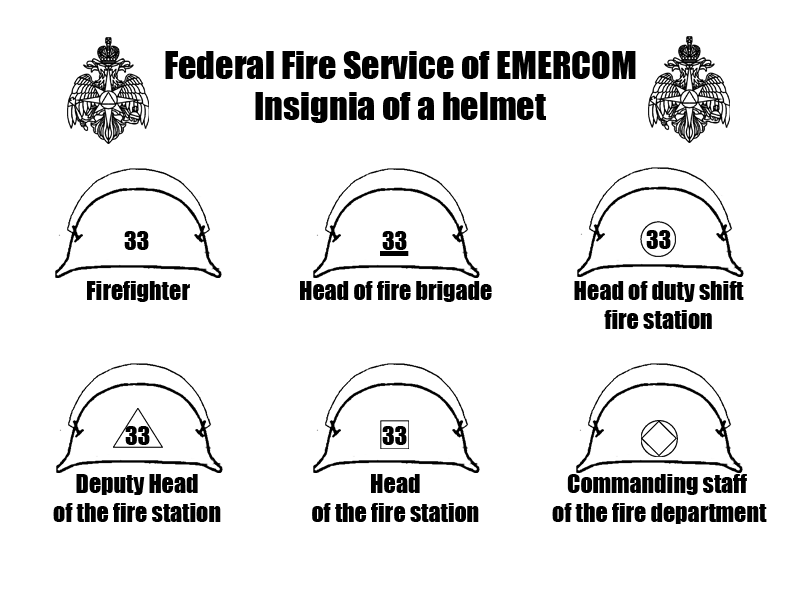
Insignia of a helmet Federal Fire Service of EMERCOM

In Russia, the decals are applied symmetrically on both sides of the helmet (front and rear). The location of the decals on the special clothing and SCBA is established for each fire department of the same type within the territorial entity.

Rank	Helmet colour/markings
Firefighter	The all color helmet with the applied number, indicating the fire station
Head of fire brigade	The all color helmet with the applied number, indicating the fire station, underlined by line 50 mm wide and 5 mm thick
Head of duty shift fire station	The all color helmet with the applied a circle, inside which the applied number is indicating the fire station
Deputy Head of the fire station	The all color helmet with the applied a triangle, inside which the applied number is indicating the fire station
Head of the fire station	The all color helmet with the applied a square, inside which the applied number is indicating the fire station
Commanding staff of the fire department	The all color helmet with the applied a circle, inside which the applied a rhombus

== Appliances ==
Russian State Fire Vehicles are painted in accordance with GOST R 50574-2002 (ГОСТ Р 50574-2002 г) which requires an overall flame-red (in practice red-orange) with contrasting white doors, white bumpers, white front and rear vertical stripes and white horizontal side stripes. Undercarriages are painted black. Auxiliary vehicles lack the white doors. Any writing or numbers are of the opposite color of the color it is on.

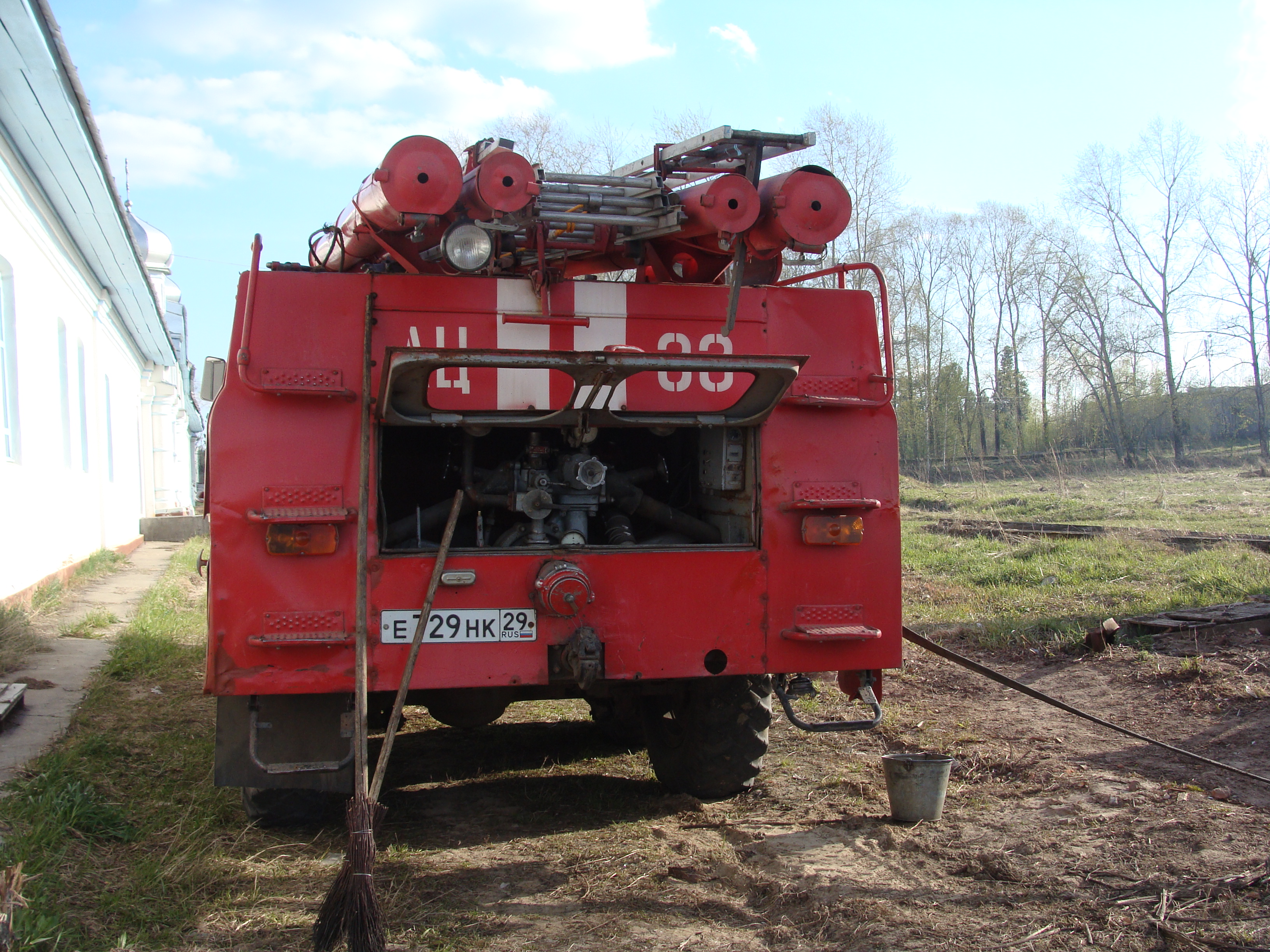
Russian fire appliance showing the top mounted ladders and canisters, with the rear mounted pump common to most Russian fire appliances .

A unique feature or Russian fire appliances is the mounting of canisters for suction hoses and ladders on top of the appliance.

The Russian Fire Service uses a number of different models of appliances which range greatly in age and technical abilities.

Firefighting vehicles are classified under the following categories:

- basic fire fighting vehicles (основные пожарные автомобили):
  - basic fire fighting vehicles of general application (основные пожарные автомобили общего применения),
  - basic fire fighting vehicles intended use (основные пожарные автомобили целевого применения);
- Special fire fighting vehicles (специальные пожарные автомобили);
- auxiliary vehicles (вспомогательные автомобили).

Model	Image	Origin	Notes
Fire Trucks
Fire truck ATs 1,5-40/2		Soviet UnionRussia	
Fire truck ATs-8-40		Russia	
Fire truck ATs 2,0-40		Russia	Most common fire truck.
Fire Truck ATs 2,0-20-2		Soviet UnionRussia	ZIL-4331A5 chassis.
Fire Truck ATs 2,5-40 (131Н)		Soviet Union	ZIL-131 chassis.
Fire Truck ATs 6,0-40		Russia	Ural NEXT chassis.
Fire Truck ATs-40/4		Russia	MAZ-631708 chassis.
Fire truck on Mercedes-Benz Atego 1529 AF chassis		Russia	
Utility Vehicles
Rescue vehicle APP-0,2-30/70		Russia	
ASh-5 Utility van		Russia	
Emergency vehicle PSA-MM		Russia	MB Sprinter 515CDI chassis
Fire patrol vehicle LPA-3		Russia	UAZ-31519 base.
Firefighting vehicle ATs 1,6-40		Russia	
VIS-294601 Utility car		Soviet Union	Few remain in service
Special Vehicles
Volkswagen Transporter (Command Vehicle)		Russia	
Forest Firefighting Truck CCF		RussiaFrance	Renault MIDLUM 240.12 CCF-4x4 chassis
Iveco Eurocargo (Mobile Air Compressor)		Russia	
Mobile airheater UMP Gorinich		Russia	KAMAZ-4326 chassis
Volkswagen LT (Command Vehicle)		Russia	
Liebherr Crane		RussiaSwitzerland	
Rosenbauer Panther 6x6 CA5		Austria	
KS-Fjord 620		Russia	
Wheeled armored fire fighting shield BLS2-40.2K		Soviet Union	
Ladder Trucks
Aerial ladder platform AKP-54		Russia	
Fire fighting vehicle AKP-32		Russia	
Fire fighting vehicle AL-30		Russia	
Aerial ladder platform AL-50		Russia	KAMAZ-65115 chassis
Fire fighting vehicle ATsL-30-40/4-24		Russia	
Equipment Trucks
Iveco Eurocargo (Technical Rescue Truck)		Russia	
Tankers
KAMAZ-43502 (Firefighting Tanker)		Russia	
Firefighting pump station PNS-110		Russia	

=== Operational categories ===
Russian Fire appliances are operationally categorized as follows:

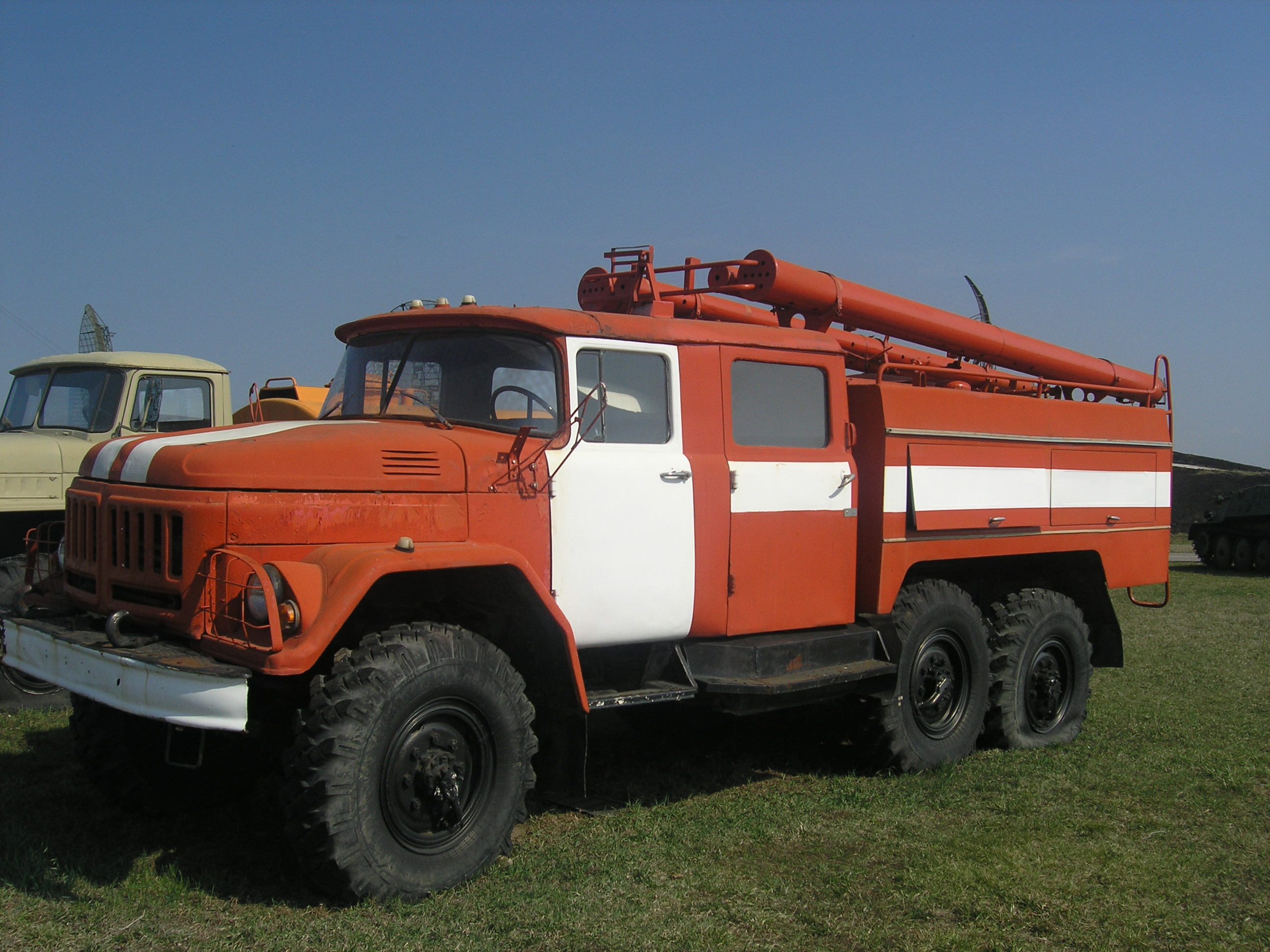
ZIL-131 based АЦ-2,5-40(131Н)-6ВР (ATs-2.5-40(131N)-6VR) on outside display at the Technical Museum of Tolyatti, Russia.

- Tankers (AC) (Автоцистерны (АЦ): A fire apparatus equipped with a pump, tanks for storing liquid extinguishing agents and means of their delivery, intended for delivery of personnel and equipment to the site of fire and carrying out fire extinguishing and rescue operations.

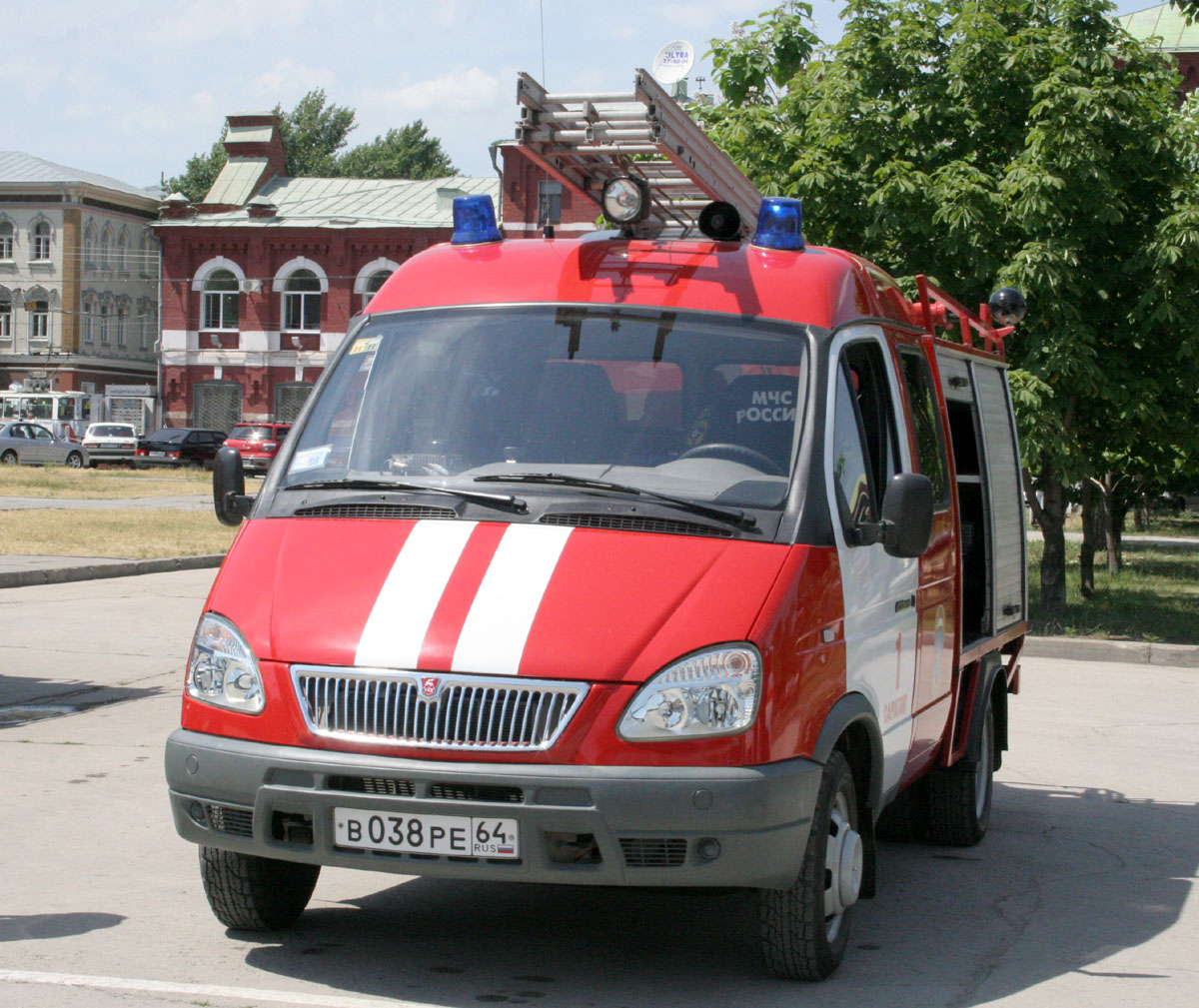
GAZelle based APP in Saratov.

- Auto First Aid (APP) (Автомобили первой помощи (АПП)): A fire apparatus on a light chassis equipped with a pumping unit, tanks for liquid extinguishing agents, and intended for delivery of personnel, equipment to the site of a fire (accident), firefighting operations at initial stage and rescue operations.
- High-pressure Pump apparatus(AVD) (Пожарный автомобиль с насосом высокого давления (АВД)): A fire apparatus equipped with a high-pressure pump, tanks for liquid extinguishing agents, a set of equipment, intended to carry out fire extinguishing activities in high-rise buildings and structures.

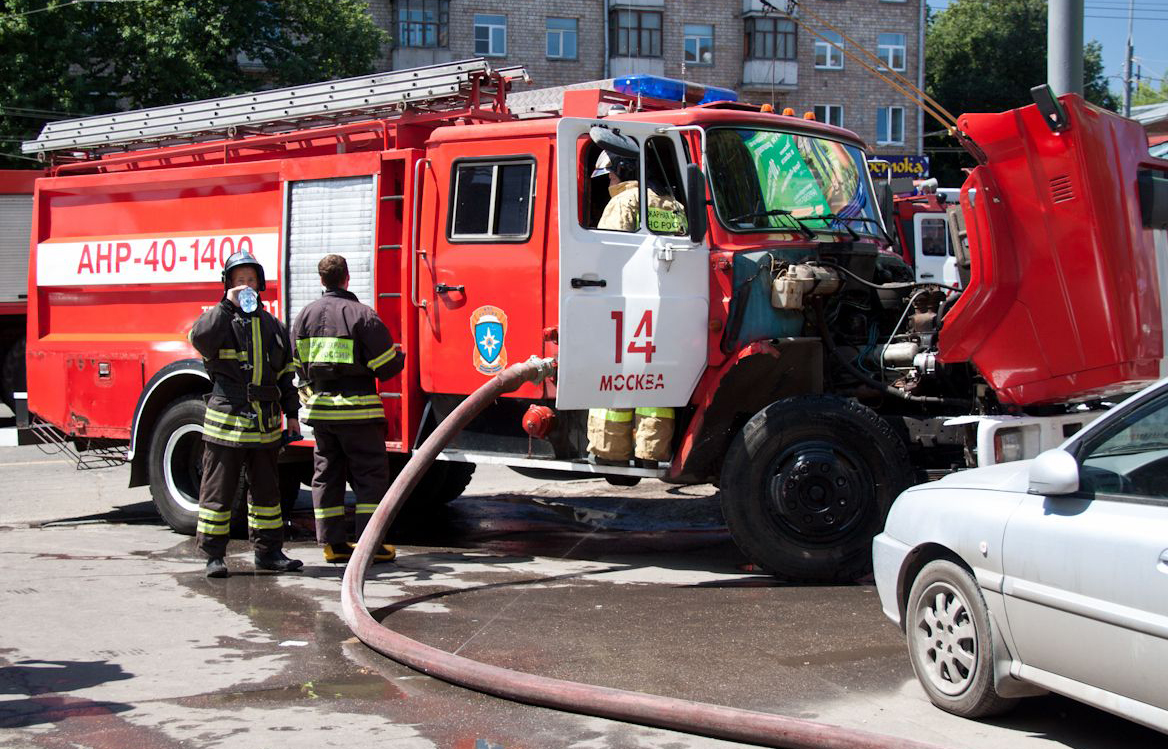
ZIL based APH

- Hose and hose-pumper cars (AR, ANR) (Рукавные и насоcно-рукавные (AP, APH)
  - Hose Carrier - Only carries hose
  - Hose Tanker - Carries hose and water and pump
- Fire ladders (AL) (Пожарные автолестницы (АЛ))
- Boom lifts (ACP) (Коленчатые подъёмники (АКП))
- Staff cars (ASH) (Штабные автомобили (АШ))

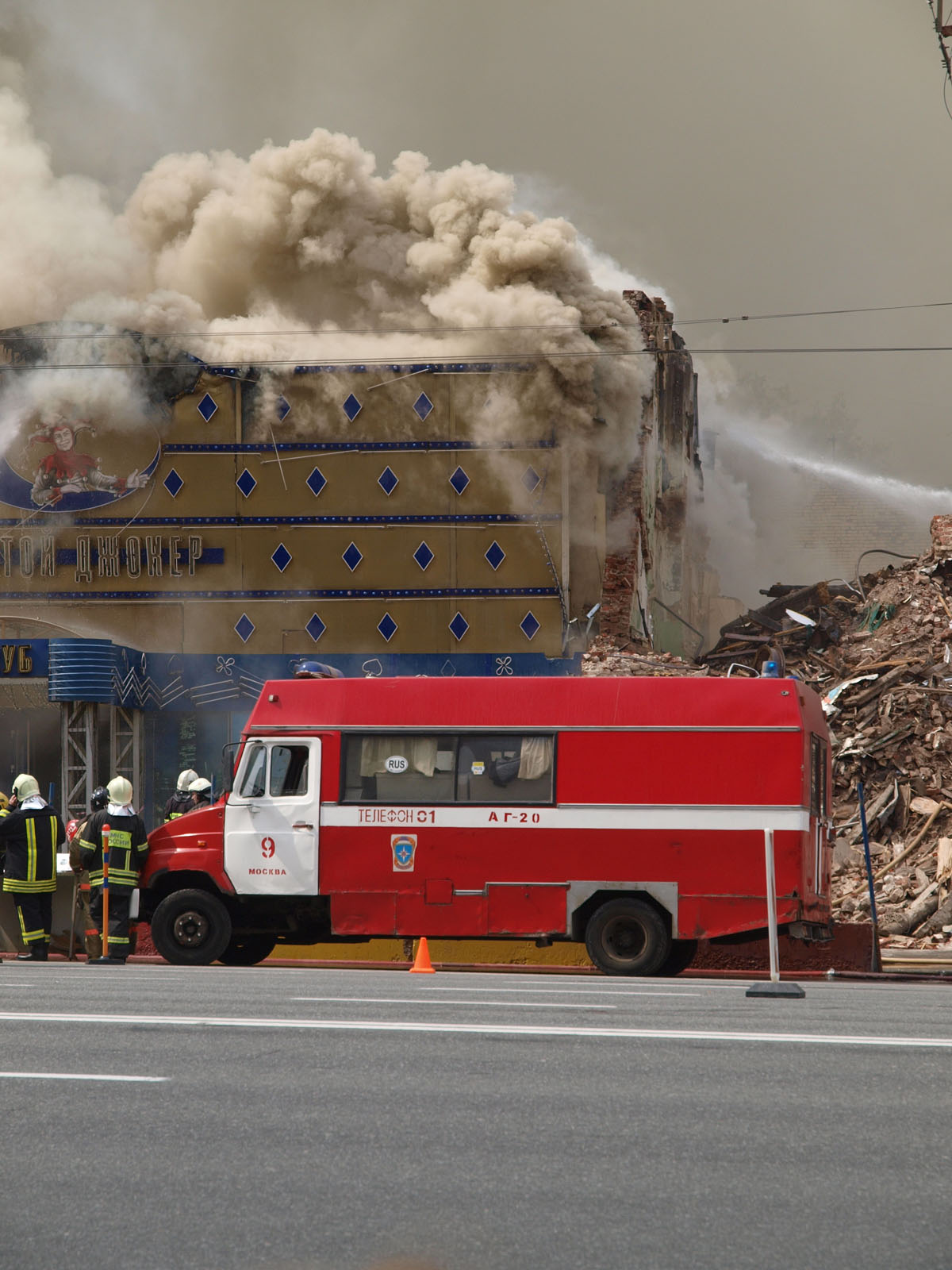
ZIL based ABG HAZMAT vehicle

- Cars Gas Rescue (AH, ABG) (Газодымозащитная служба (ГДЗС))
- Cars specialized fire (AGT AGVT, ACT, AP) (Автомобили специализированного тушения (АГТ, АГВТ, АКТ, АП))
- Cars Command and communications (ASO) (Автомобили связи и оcвещения (АСО))
- Rescue vehicles (ASA) (Спасательные автомобили (АСА))
- Cars Airfield Fire (Пожарный аэродромный автомобиль (AA)

== See also ==
- Awards of the Ministry for Emergency Situations of Russia
- List of fire departments
