= KamAZ-435029 Patrul-A =

Russian infantry mobility vehicle

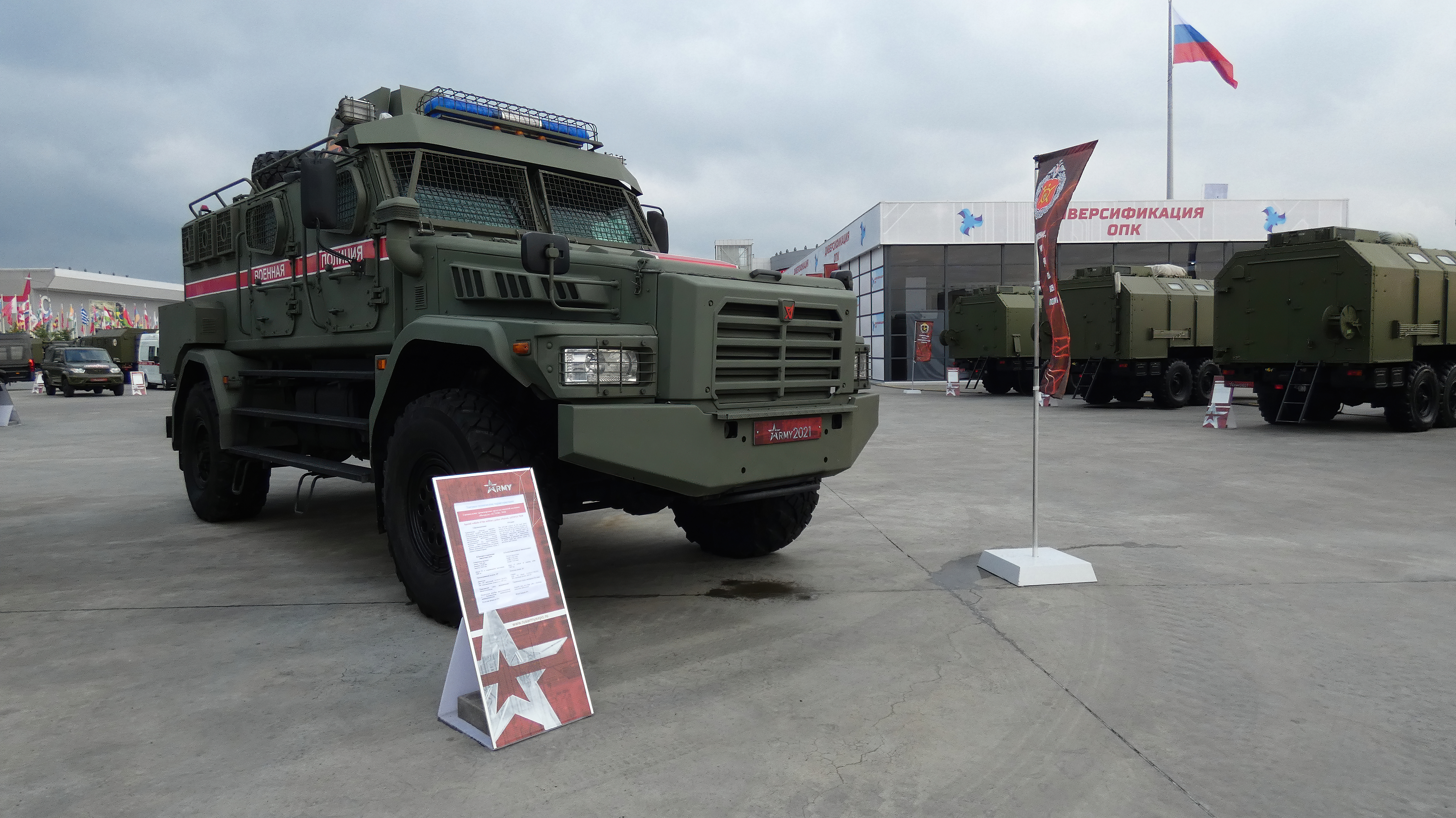
KamAZ-435029 Patrul-A

The KamAZ-435029 Patrul-A (Russian: Патруль-A, lit. 'Patrol-A') is a Russian infantry mobility vehicle designed for the Ministry of Internal Affairs and the National Guard of Russia, as well as the Russian Armed Forces.

== History ==
Patrul-A was developed by order of the National Guard. The development of the vehicle started from the middle of 2014 and the first prototype was manufactured in 2015. This MRAP vehicle is based on a KamAZ-43501 4x4 chassis (+ engine and transmission). Astais company has developed three versions of the vehicle. One of them is for the Ministry of Defence. “ The vehicles will be used to escort and guard convoys, fulfill patrolling missions and protect the crews from the effects of small arms and explosive devices,” the Defence Ministry’s press office said. The Patruls were tested during Defence Ministry expeditions to the Arctic Ocean and Mount Elbrus and demonstrated high operational capabilities there. Subsequently a batch of vehicles was transferred to serve in the armed forces of Russia and was used during the Russo-Ukrainian War.

== Tactical and technical data ==
The armored vehicle is designed for patrolling the area, reconnaissance, transporting personnel, performing special tasks, including in urban areas.

The vehicle has an armored capsule that protects the 10-man crew against 5.45 mm and 7.62 mm bullets. It also withstands the blast of an explosive device equivalent to 2 kg of TNT under its wheels or bottom. The fuel tanks are protected by a liquid coating that seals bullet-pierced holes and prevents fuel leakage. The vehicle’s gross weight is 12.7 tons and maximum speed 100 km/h. The vehicle’s range is 1,000 km (621 miles).

- Number of drive wheels: 4
- Number of wheels: 4
- Crew: 10
- Length, m: 7.4
- Height, m: 3.02500
- Ground clearance, mm: 380
- Fording depth, mm: 1700
- Trench, mm: 600
- Gross weight, ton: 12.7
- Engine power, hp: 260
- Wheelbase, mm: 4180
- Maximum road speed, km/h: 100
- Maximum road range, km: 1,000
- Vertical obstacle, mm: 500
- Load capacity, kg: 1500

== Service within the Russian National Guard ==
Initially, the vehicle was supposed to serve in the internal troops of the Ministry of Internal Affairs, but subsequently entered service with the Russian National Guard.

One of the prototypes of the vehicle entered service with the SOBR of the Russian Guard of St. Petersburg in March 2017. In 2019, plans were announced to purchase a batch of vehicles for other units of the Russian Guard. In 2023, three new armored vehicles "Patrol" entered service with units of the Russian Guard in the Khanty-Mansi Autonomous Okrug, including the local SOBR and OMON. Also in 2023, "Patrol" entered service with the Russian Guard of the Zaporizhia Oblast.

In addition to the Russian National Guard, the armored vehicle was supposed to enter service with the Russian Armed Forces; in particular, the vehicles were supposed to be in service with the Russian 201st Military Base in Tajikistan.

== Operational history ==
It was used by the Russian side during the invasion of Ukraine, and was also deployed during military operations in Syria.

== Operators ==
Russia

- National Guard of Russia (SOBR and OMON).
- Russian Armed Forces.

== See also ==
- KamAZ-4350
- Tigr (military vehicle)
