= Ministry of Forestry =

Ministry of Forestry may refer to:

- Ministry of Forestry (China), former ministry of China
- Ministry of Forestry (Indonesia), Indonesian ministry for forestry
- Ministry of Forestry (Soviet Union), former ministry of the Soviet Union

== See also ==
- List of forestry ministries
