= KamAZ-4326 =

Russian four-wheel drive truck

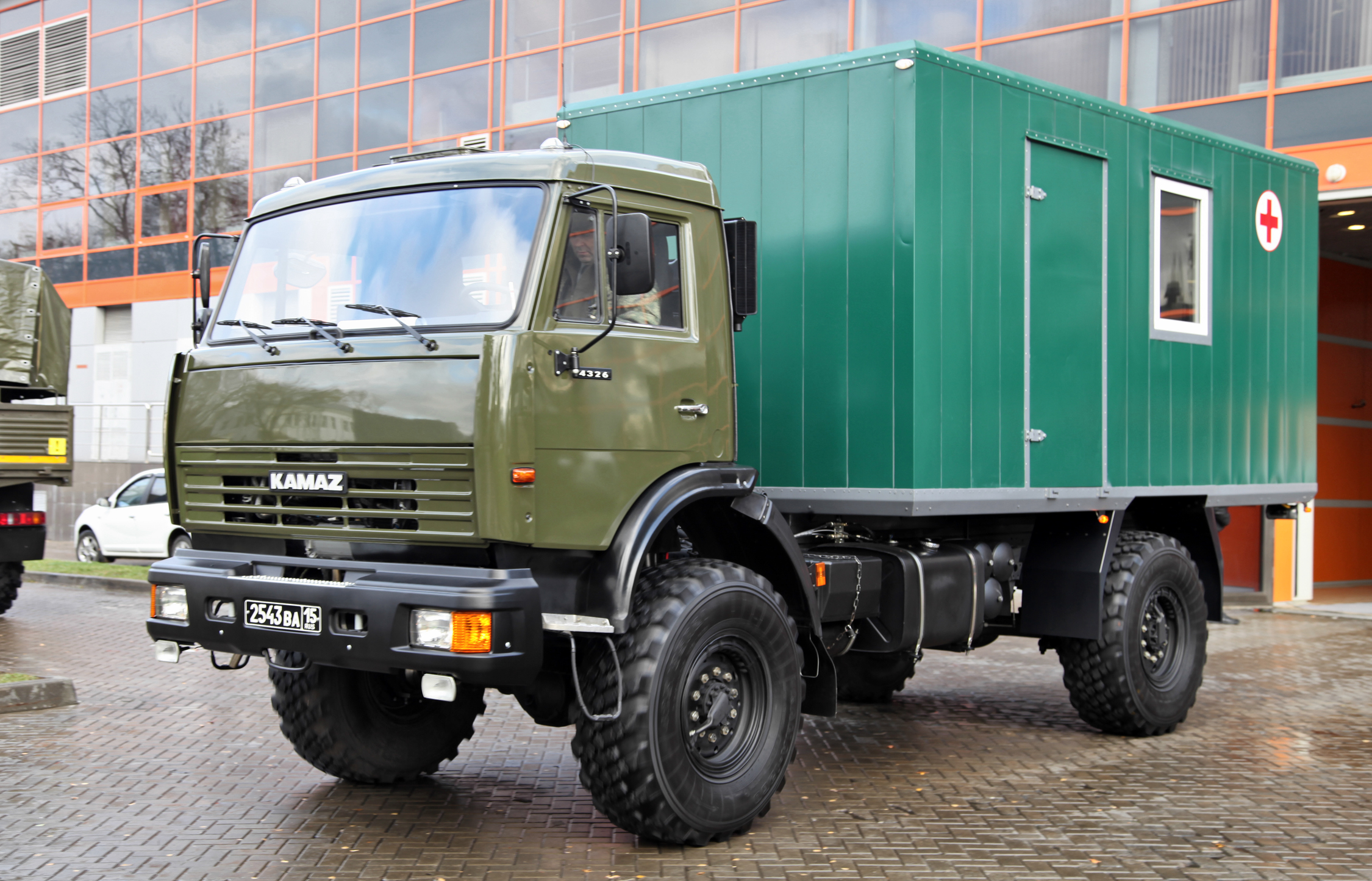

Overview
- Manufacturer: Kamaz
- Production: 1995–present
- Assembly: Naberezhnye Chelny, Russia

Body and chassis
- Class: Rough terrain truck
- Layout: All-wheel drive

Dimensions
- Wheelbase: 4,200 mm (165 in)
- Length: 7,935 mm (312 in)
- Width: 2,500 mm (98 in)
- Height: 2,945 mm (116 in)

Chronology
- Successor: KamAZ-4350

The KamAZ-4326 (Russian: КамАЗ-4326) is a four-wheel drive truck produced by Kamaz in Naberezhnye Chelny. The vehicle has been in production since 1995 and is also designed for military applications. With the KamAZ-4350, there is a modernized successor. The KamAZ-43114 is very similar to the KamAZ-4326, but has three axles instead of two.

== History ==
The development of the KamAZ-4326 goes back to the 1980s. At that time, the KAMAZ plant produced some prototypes of a two-axle all-terrain truck based on the KamAZ-4310. These vehicles were already given the designation KamAZ-4326. Since the factory was busy with an annual production of over 110,000 trucks at the time, the new model did not go into series production.

After the collapse of the Soviet Union, the idea was taken up again. Series production began in 1995 without any major changes to the design. A large-volume diesel engine and an in-house gearbox were used. A large wading depth of 1.5 meters, permanent all-wheel drive and large individual tires on all wheels ensure the necessary off-road mobility.

A version with a wheelbase that is around 50 centimeters shorter has been manufactured since the early 2000s. A more modern successor has been built with the KamAZ-4350 since 2003. The KamAZ-4326, on the other hand, has not been offered to private customers since at least 2015.

== Variants ==
In addition to the basic version, which has been produced since 1995, there are several other variants that vary in particular due to the mounted superstructure. The list does not claim to be complete.

- KamAZ-43261 – Version with a shortened wheelbase released in the 2000s.
- AZ-40/4 (43261) 249 – Fire service vehicle based on the KamAZ-43261.
- AZ-4-2,5 (4326) – Fire truck that uses the basic version as a chassis.
- NefAZ-42111 – vehicle for passenger transport. The truck's driver's cab is retained, but instead of a flatbed, a closed body with seats and windows is put on. Also as a combination bus with a short loading area.
- Special superstructures were also installed, for example for winter service.
- KamAZ-4326-9 – racing vehicle for participation in the Dakar Rally.

There is also the KamAZ-43114 with three axles and a significantly higher payload. The KamAZ-4326 also serves as a substructure for various special military vehicles. This also includes the KamAZ-43269 armored car.

== Gallery ==
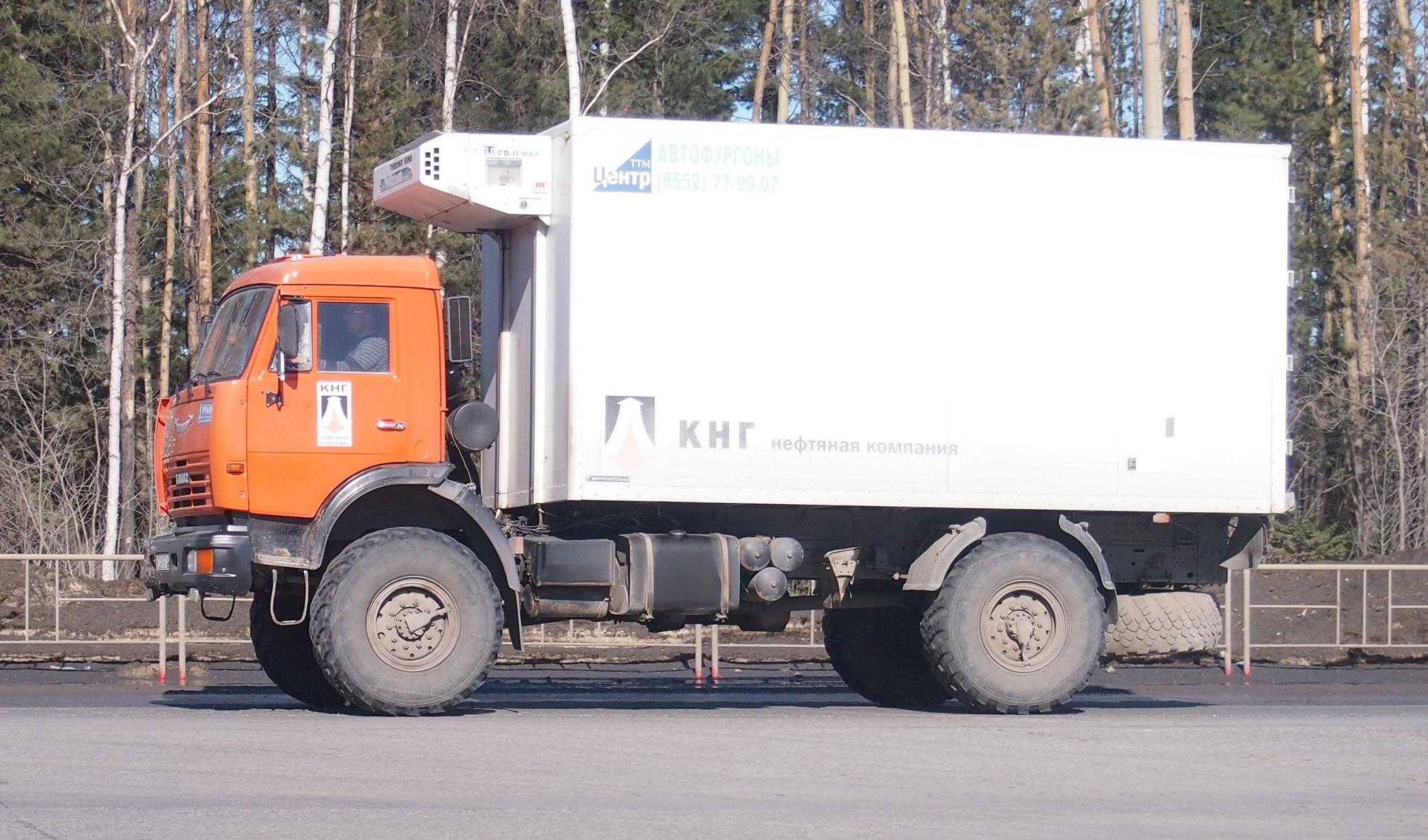
Civilian KamAZ-4326 with refrigerated box in Khanty-Mansiysk (2015)

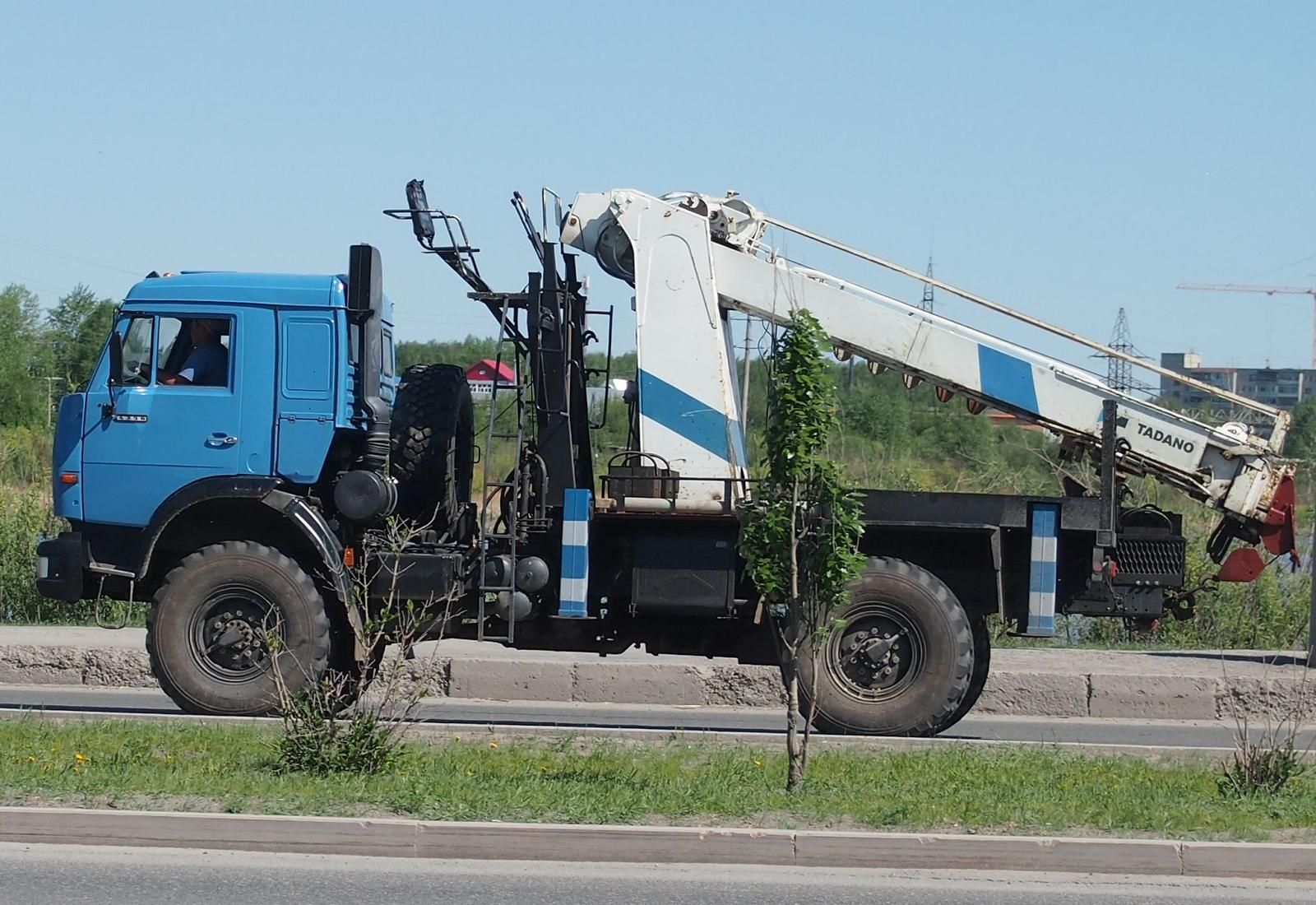
Civilian KamAZ-4326 with crane superstructure (2014)

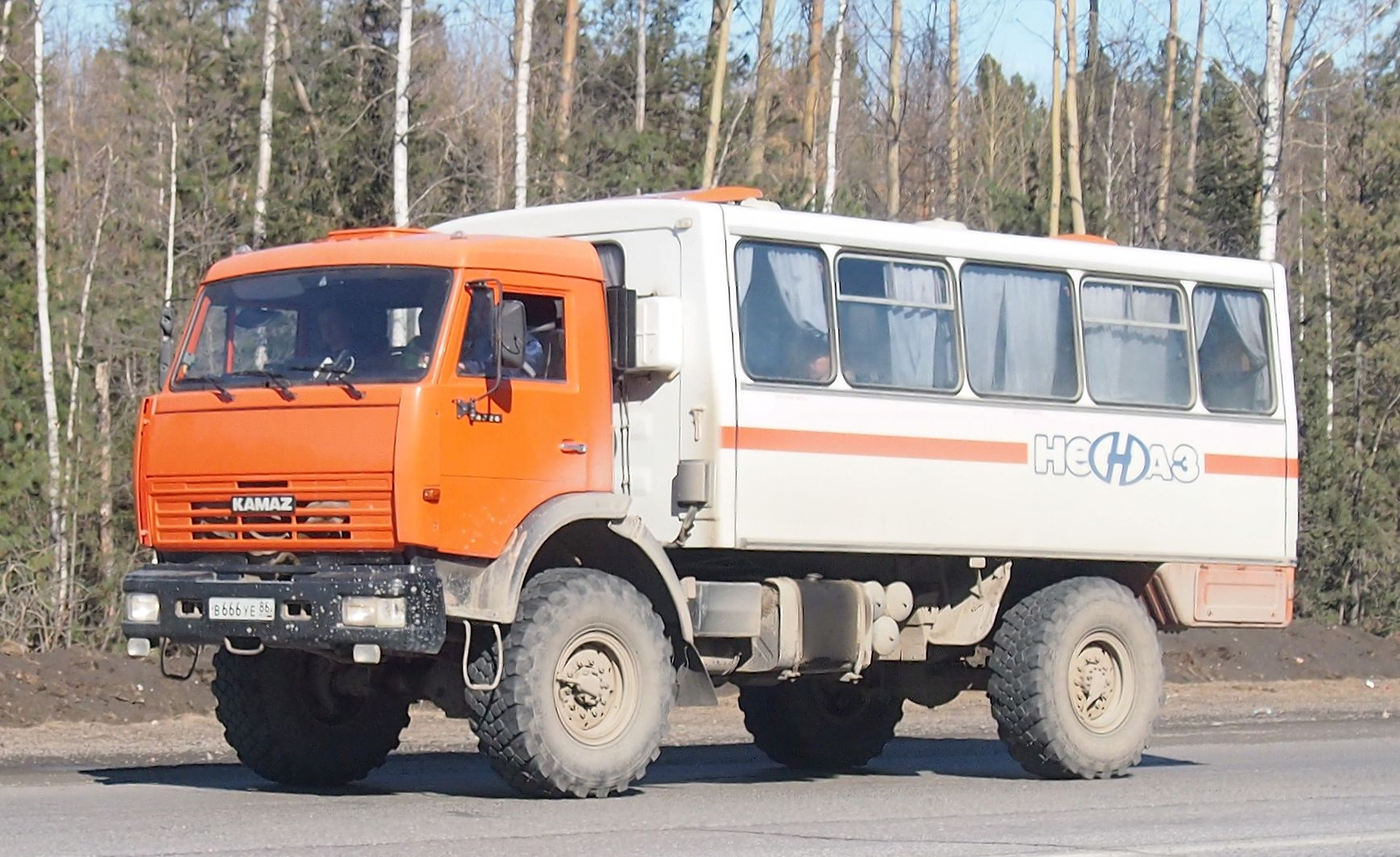
NefAZ-42111, instead of the loading area, a body for passenger transport is installed (2015)

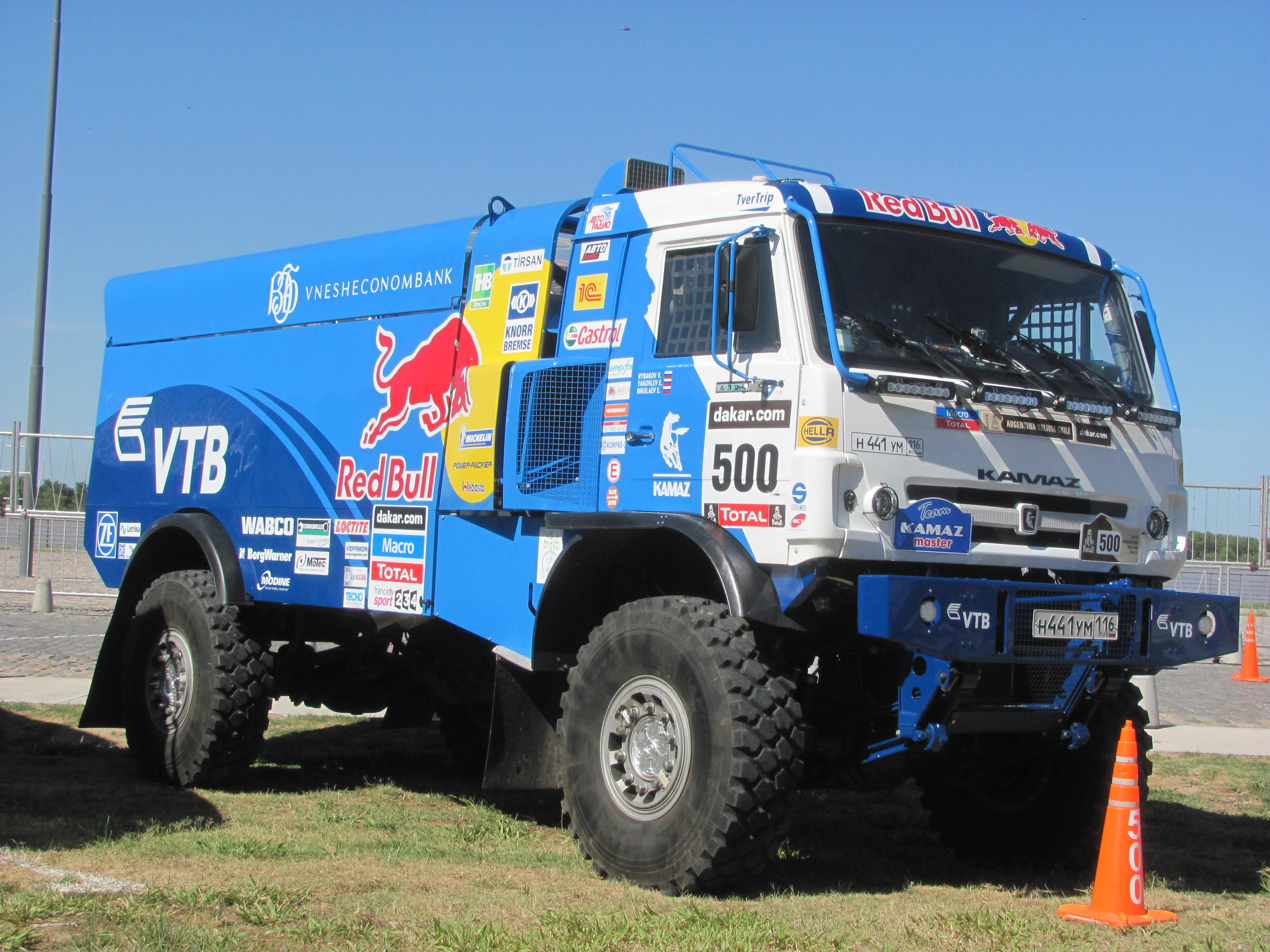
KamAZ-4326-9 for participation in the 2013 Dakar Rally
