= KamAZ-4350 =

Russian four-wheel drive truck

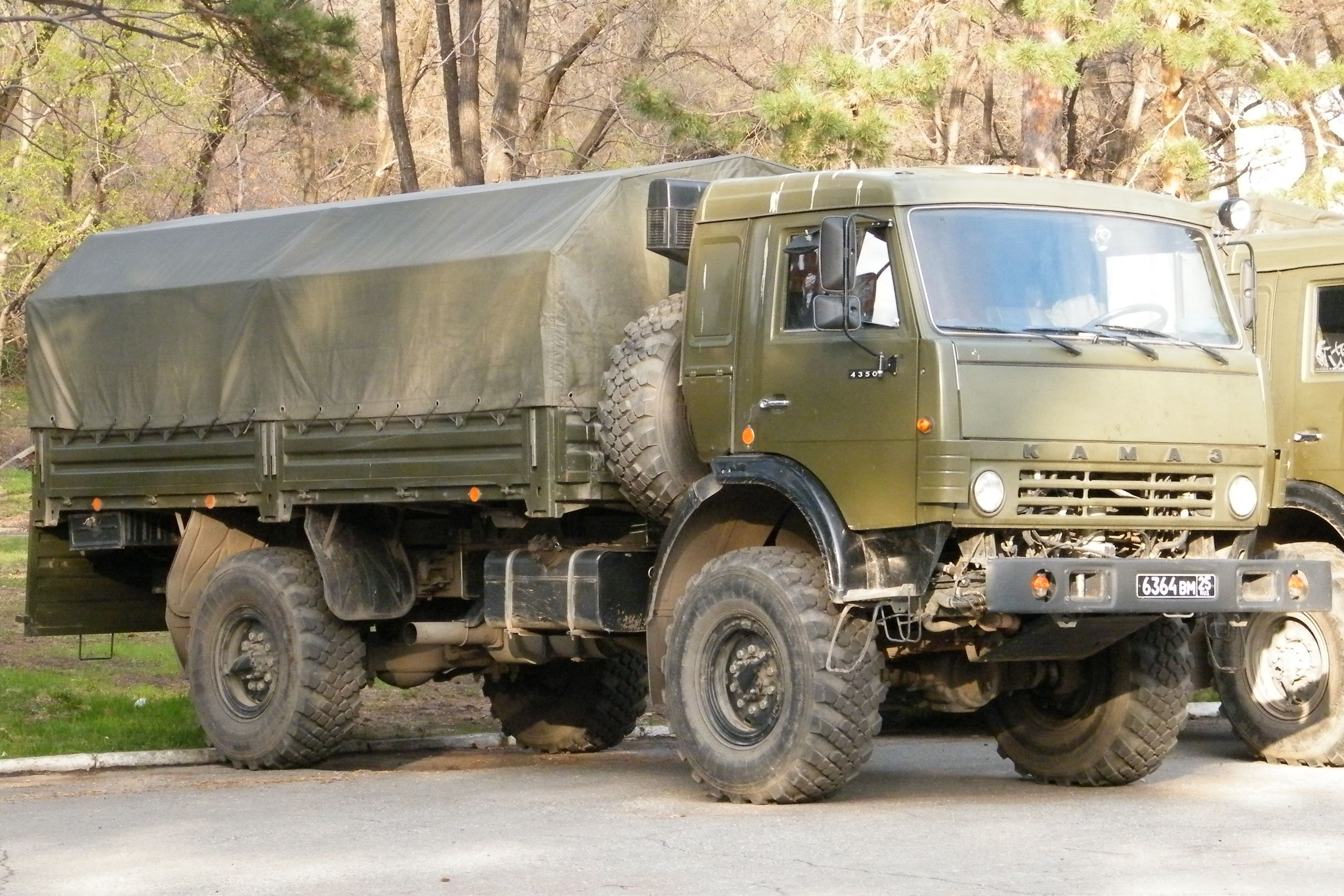

Overview
- Manufacturer: Kamaz
- Production: 2003–present
- Assembly: Naberezhnye Chelny, Russia

Body and chassis
- Class: Rough terrain truck
- Layout: All-wheel drive

Dimensions
- Wheelbase: 4,180 mm (165 in)
- Length: 7,950 mm (313 in)
- Width: 2,550 mm (100 in)
- Height: 3,110 mm (122 in)

Chronology
- Predecessor: KamAZ-4326

The KamAZ-4350 (Russian: КамАЗ-4350), also known as "Mustang" (Russian: Мустанг), is a four-wheel drive truck produced by Kamaz in Naberezhnye Chelny. The vehicle has been in production since 2003 and is also designed for military applications. With the KamAZ-43501, there is a version with a slightly lower payload.

In addition to the KamAZ-4350 with two axles, there are also the KamAZ-5350 with three and the KamAZ-6350 with four axles.

== History ==
As with the other trucks in the vehicle family, prototypes of the KamAZ-4350 appeared in 1991. After the decision of the Russian Armed Forces to buy trucks from the series in 2002, production began in 2003. This step was decided in particular because not all of the military's wishes could be implemented on the existing KamAZ-4326.

The construction of the KamAZ-4350 is similar to that of the prototypes and that of the other trucks from the series. The engine and transmission come from our own production. The built-in diesel engine is a V8 with a displacement of almost eleven liters. The manual gearbox is a standard five-speed gearbox, with a two-stage off-road reduction being connected downstream. This means that there are effectively ten gears available.

The powerful motor, permanent all-wheel drive, all-terrain reduction ratio and the individual tires used all around ensure the necessary off-road mobility. In addition, the vehicle is able to drive through bodies of water up to 1.75 meters deep.
