= Ministry of Forestry (Soviet Union) =

Government ministry of the Soviet Union

The Ministry of Forestry (Russian: Министерство лесного хозяйства СССР) was a government ministry in the Soviet Union in charge of the protection and management of forest resources.

== History ==
On 2 July 1936, the Main Administration of Forest Conservation and Forestation under the Council of People's Commissars USSR was formed by decree of the Central Executive Committee and Council of People's Commissars.

On 4 April 1947, the union-republic Ministry of Forestry with ministries of forestries in all union republics was formed on the basis of the Main Administration of Forest Conservation (apparently a change in name occurred between 1936 and 1947) under the Council of Ministers USSR by ukase of the Presidium of the Supreme Soviet USSR.

== List of ministers ==
- German Motovilov (4.4.1947 - 20.11.1948)
- Aleksandr Bovin (20.11.1948 - 15.3.1953)
